= List of literary descriptions of cities (before 1550) =

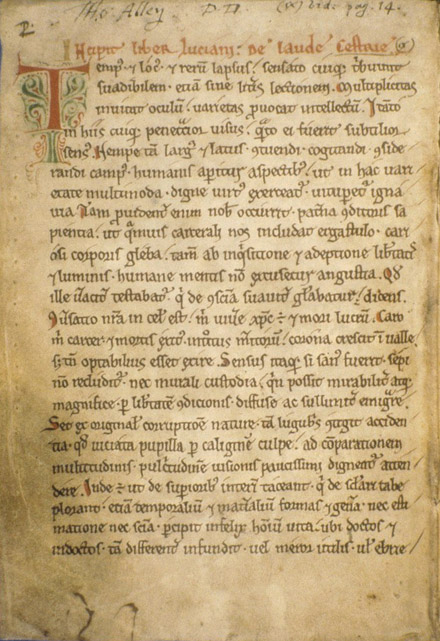
Initial folio of De laude Cestrie, a c.1195 eulogy to the English town of Chester

Literary descriptions of cities (also known as descriptiones urbium) form a literary genre that originated in Ancient Greek epideictic rhetoric. They can be prose or poetry. Many take the form of an urban eulogy (variously referred to as an encomium urbis, laudes urbium, encomium civis, laus civis, laudes civitatum; or in English: urban or city encomium, panegyric, laudation or praise poem) which praise their subject. Laments to a city's past glories are sometimes also included in the genre. Descriptiones often mix topographical information with abstract material on the spiritual and legal aspects of the town or city, and with social observations on its inhabitants. They generally give a more extended treatment of their urban subject than is found in an encyclopedia or general geographical work. Influential examples include Benedict's Mirabilia Urbis Romae of around 1143.

The earliest ancestor of the literary genre can be found in the New Kingdom Egyptian "praises of the cities", describing in poetic forms e.g. Thebes and Pi-Ramesses.

The Greek rhetorician Dionysius of Halicarnassus, in the first century AD, was the first to prescribe the form of a eulogy to a city in detail. Features he touches on include the city's location, size and beauty; the qualities of its river; its temples and secular buildings; its origin and founder, and the acts of its citizens. The Roman rhetorician Quintilian expounds on the form later in the first century, stressing praise of the city's founder and prominent citizens, as well as the city's site and location, fortifications and public works such as temples. The third-century rhetorician Menander expands on the guidelines further, including advice on how to turn a city's bad points into advantages. These works were probably not directly available to medieval writers, but the form is outlined in many later grammar primers, including those by Donatus and Priscian. Priscian's Praeexercitamina, a translation into Latin of a Greek work by Hermogenes, was a particular influence on medieval authors.

Surviving late Roman examples of descriptiones include Ausonius's Ordo Nobilium Urbium, a fourth-century Latin poem that briefly describes thirteen cities including Milan and Bordeaux. Rutilius Namatianus's De reditu suo is a longer poem dating from the early fifth century that includes a section praising Rome.

Numerous medieval examples have survived, mainly but not exclusively in Latin, the earliest dating from the eighth century. They adapt the classical form to Christian theology. The form was popularised by widely circulated guidebooks intended for pilgrims. Common topics include the city walls and gates, markets, churches and local saints; descriptiones were sometimes written as a preface to the biography of a saint. The earliest examples are in verse. The first known prose example was written in around the tenth century, and later medieval examples were more often written in prose. Milan and Rome are the most frequent subjects, and there are also examples describing many other Italian cities. Outside Italy, pre-1400 examples are known for Chester, Durham, London, York and perhaps Bath in England, Newborough in Wales, and Angers, Paris and Senlis in France. The form spread to Germany in the first half of the 15th century, with Nuremberg being the most commonly described city.

J. K. Hyde, who surveyed the genre in 1966, considers the evolution of descriptiones written before 1400 to reflect "the growth of cities and the rising culture and self-confidence of the citizens", rather than any literary progression. Later medieval examples tend to be more detailed and less generic than early ones, and to place an increasing emphasis on secular over religious aspects. For example, Bonvesin della Riva's 1288 description of Milan, De Magnalibus Urbis Mediolani, contains a wealth of detailed facts and statistics about such matters as local crops. These trends were continued in Renaissance descriptiones, which flourished from the early years of the 15th century, especially after the popularisation of the printing press from the middle of that century.

== Selected examples ==
The following chronological list presents urban descriptions and eulogies written before the end of the 14th century, based mainly on the reviews of Hyde and Margaret Schlauch, with a selection from the many examples written from 1400 to 1550.

Title	Date	Author	City	Country	Format	Language	Notes
Antiochicus	c. 360	Libanius	Antioch	Syria	Prose	Latin	Also called Oration in Praise of Antioch, this is Libanius' Oration XI.
Ordo Nobilium Urbium	4th century	Ausonius	Various		Poetry	Latin	
De reditu suo	Early 5th century	Rutilius Namatianus	Rome	Italy	Poetry	Latin	
Laudes Mediolanensis civitatis	~738		Milan	Italy	Poetry	Latin	Or Versum de Mediolano civitate
De laude Pampilone epistola	7th century		Pamplona	Spain	Prose	Latin	The laudatio is known from a composite with an unrelated text dating from c. 410
Versiculi familiae Benchuir	8th century		Bangor	Ireland	Poetry	Latin	The Versiculi form a "religios laus civitatis in praise of a monastic community.
Poema de Pontificibus et Sanctis Eboracensis Ecclesiae	Early or mid-780s	Alcuin	York	England	Poetry	Latin	
Versus de Destructione Aquileiae	Late 8th century	Paulinus of Aquileia or Paul the Deacon	Aquileia	Italy	Poetry	Latin	Attribution disputed
Laudes Veronensis Civitatis	796–806		Verona	Italy	Poetry	Latin	Or Veronae rhythmica, Versus de Verona
The Ruin	8th – late 9th century		An unnamed Roman spa, probably Bath	England	Poetry	Old English	Date uncertain; subject has also been suggested to be Chester or a town near Hadrian's Wall
Versus de Aquilegia	844–855		Aquileia	Italy	Poetry	Latin	
De Situ Civitatis Mediolani	~780–1000		Milan	Italy	Prose	Latin	Or De situ urbis Mediolanensis
Opening of the Vita Theoderici	1050–1060	Sigebert of Gembloux	Metz	Holy Roman Empire	Prose	Latin	Found at the start of a biography of Bishop Dietrich I of Metz, written during the episcopate of Adalbero III.
Durham	Mid-11th century to ~1107		Durham	England	Poetry	Old English	Or De situ Dunelmi; date disputed
Liber Pergaminus	1112–33	Moses de Brolo	Bergamo	Italy	Poetry	Latin	
Mirabilia Urbis Romae	~1140–43	Benedict	Rome	Italy	Prose	Latin	
Descriptio Nobilissimae Civitatis Londoniae	1173–74	William Fitzstephen	London	England	Prose	Latin	Or Descriptio Nobilissimi Civitatis Londoniae
De mirabilibus urbis Romae	1150–1200	Master Gregory	Rome	Italy		Latin	
De laude Cestrie	~1195	Lucian of Chester	Chester	England	Prose	Latin	Or Liber Luciani de laude Cestrie
In Ymagines historiarum	~1180–1200	Ralph de Diceto	Angers	Angevin Empire	Prose	Latin	
Graphia Aureae Urbis Romae	~1154–1280		Rome	Italy		Latin	
De Laude Civitatis Laude	~1253–59	An unnamed Franciscan	Lodi	Italy	Poetry	Latin	
Liber de preconiis ciuitatis Numantine	1282	Juan Gil de Zamora	Zamora	Spain	Prose	Latin	
De Magnalibus Urbis Mediolani	1288	Bonvesin della Riva	Milan	Italy	Prose	Latin	
De Mediolano Florentissima Civitate	~1316	Benzo d'Alessandria	Milan	Italy	Prose	Latin	
Visio Egidii Regis Patavii	~1318	Giovanni da Nono	Padua	Italy	Prose	Latin	
Byzantios	post 1312	Theodore Metochites	Constantinople	Byzantium	Prose	Greek	
Recommentatio Civitatis Parisiensis	1323		Paris	France	Prose	Latin	
Tractatus de Laudibus Parisius	1323	Jean de Jandun	Paris, Senlis	France	Prose	Latin	Written in response to Recommentatio Civitatis Parisiensis
Libellus de Descriptione Papie	1330	Opicino de Canistris	Pavia	Italy	Prose	Latin	Or Liber de laudibus civitatis Ticinensis
Polistoria de virtutibus et dotibus Romanorum	1320–46	Giovanni Caballini	Rome	Italy	Prose	Latin	
Cronaca Extravagans	1329–39	Galvano Fiamma	Milan	Italy	Prose	Latin	Contains material from Bonvesin della Riva's text
Cronica Book XI	1338	Giovanni Villani	Florence	Italy	Prose	Italian	
Florentie Urbis et Reipublice Descriptio	1339		Florence	Italy	Prose	Latin	Manuscript is untitled
Cywydd Rhosyr	Mid 14th century	Dafydd ap Gwilym	Newborough	Wales	Poetry	Welsh	Date and attribution uncertain
Laudatio florentinae urbis	~1400	Leonardo Bruni	Florence	Italy	Prose	Latin	
Laudatio Urbis Romae et Constantinopolis	~1411	Manuel Chrysoloras	Rome	Italy	Prose	Greek	
"O wunnikliches Paradis"	1414–18 or after 1430	Oswald von Wolkenstein	Konstanz	Holy Roman Empire	Poetry	German	Von Wolkenstein also wrote poems on other cities, including Nuremberg and Augsburg
Descriptio urbis Romae eiusque excellentiae	~1430	Niccolò Signorili	Rome	Italy	Prose	Latin	
Roma instaurata	1446	Flavio Biondo	Rome	Italy	Prose	Latin	
Lobspruch auf Nürnberg	1447	Hans Rosenplüt	Nuremberg	Germany	Poetry	German	
Ye Solace of Pilgrimes	~1450	John Capgrave	Rome	Italy	Prose	Middle English	
Canmol Croesoswallt	Mid 15th century	Guto'r Glyn	Oswestry	England	Poetry	Welsh	
I Varedydd ab Hywel ab Morus, ac i Drev Croes Oswallt	Mid 15th century	Lewys Glyn Cothi	Oswestry	England	Poetry	Welsh	
"Y ddewistref ddiestron"	Mid 15th century	Ieuan ap Gruffudd Leiaf	Conwy	Wales	Poetry	Welsh	
Die Bamberger Traktate	1452	Albrecht von Eyb	Bamberg	Germany		Latin	
"[What a splendid appearance this city presents!]"	Late 1450s	Enea Silvio Piccolomini	Nuremberg	Germany	Prose	Latin	
Lobspruch auf Bamberg	~1459	Hans Rosenplüt	Bamberg	Germany	Poetry	German	
Brodyr aeth i Baradwys	Late 15th century	Ieuan ap Huw Cae Llwyd	Brecon	Wales	Poetry	Welsh	
"Cistiau da, 'n costio dierth"	End of the 15th century	Tudur Aled	Oswestry	England	Poetry	Welsh	
Lobspruch auf Nürnberg	~1490–92	Kunz Hass	Nuremberg	Germany	Poetry	German	
De Venetae urbis situ / Del sito di Vinegia	1492	Marcantonio Sabellico	Venice	Italy	Prose	Latin, Italian	
De origine, situ, moribus et institutis Norimbergae	~1492–96	Conrad Celtis	Nuremberg	Germany	Prose	Latin	
To the City of London	~1501	Sometimes attributed to William Dunbar	London	England	Poetry	English	Or In Honour of the City of London; It is the basis for the cantata In Honour of the City of London (1937).
Tractatus de civitate Ulmensi	By 1502	Felix Fabri	Ulm	Germany		Latin	
Blyth Aberdeane	~1511	William Dunbar	Aberdeen	Scotland	Poetry	Middle Scots	
Ein Lobspruch der statt Nürnberg	~1530	Hans Sachs	Nuremberg	Germany	Poetry	German	Sachs also wrote praise poems to Salzburg (1549), Munich (1565), Frankfurt (1568) and Hamburg (1569)
Ein Lobspruch der Hochloeblichen weitberuembten Khuenigklichen Stat Wienn in Osterreich	1547	Wolfgang Schmeltzl	Vienna	Austria	Poetry	German	

== See also ==
- Guide book
- Travel literature
