= Laudes Mediolanensis civitatis =

Medieval Latin poem

Laudes Mediolanensis civitatis ("Praises of the City of Milan"), also known as the Versum de Mediolano civitate ("Verse of the City of Milan") or Versus in laudem mediolanensis civitatis ("Verse in Praise of the City of Milan"), is an early medieval Latin poem, which describes and praises the Italian city of Milan. It dates from the mid-8th century, during the era of the Lombard Kingdom. The poet is unknown. The poem is an encomium, an example of the urban eulogy genre. It celebrates not only the Christian heritage of Milan, but also its pagan Roman history. It is considered to be the earliest surviving medieval description of a city. The poem served as a model for the Carolingian Versus de Verona, a similar encomium to its rival Verona, written around 50 years later.

== Background and history ==
Laudes Mediolanensis civitatis has been dated at around 738, or 739–49. The Milan of that date was a bustling city in the Lombard Kingdom in northern Italy, which had regained its stability after the collapse of the Roman Empire. The anonymous poet is likely to have been a clergyman. No contemporary Milanese manuscript copies have survived, and the poem is known from a single 9th-century manuscript from the Chapter Library of Verona, another city in Lombardy.

Milan was a popular subject for writers. Ordo Nobilium Urbium, a 4th-century poem by the Roman poet Ausonius, includes a brief section on the city. Later medieval descriptions include the anonymous De situ civitatis Mediolani (780–1000), and ones written by Bonvesin da la Riva (1288) and Benzo d'Alessandria (around 1316), all of which are in prose.

Other 8th-century poems on an urban subject include Alcuin's poem praising the English city of York (780s), and a poem lamenting the destruction of the Italian city of Aquileia, which was possibly written by the city's ruler, Paulinus II (late 8th century).

== Structure ==
The poem has 72 lines, arranged in 24 stanzas, each of which has three lines. The opening stanzas read:

Alta urbs et spaciosa manet in Italia,
firmiter edificata opere mirifico,
que ab antiquitus vocatur Mediolanum civitas.

Bonam retinet decoris speciem et variis
rutilat culture modis ornata perspicue:
locus ita fructuosus constat in planicie.

Celsas habet opertasque turres in circuitu
studio nitentes magnas scultantes forinsecus;
que introrsus decorata manet edificiis.

The poem is organised on an alphabetical scheme; the stanzas start with the letters "A", "B", "C", and so on, with the penultimate stanza starting with a "Z". An additional Gloria concludes the poem.

== Subject ==
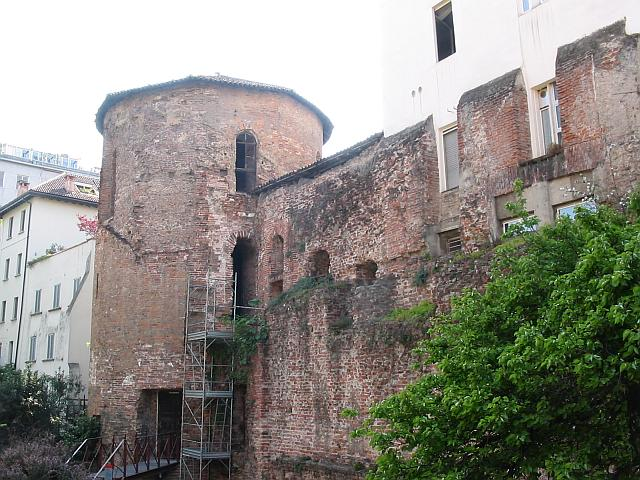
Part of Milan's Roman walls, which are described in the poem

The poem opens with a brief description of Milan's city walls, towers and gates; its public buildings, including the forum; and its paved streets and water supply. For example, lines 16–18 praise the city's "forum, with very beautiful buildings, and all its roads are solidly paved with blocks; it draws water for its baths through an aqueduct". The reference to "solid paving" appears to conflict with archaeological evidence.

In describing the city's buildings, the poet pays particular attention to the churches. The bulk of the verses retell the spiritual history of Milan and discuss the characteristics of the Milanese church, including its unique Ambrosian rite. The poem praises the Milanese citizens for their piety and charitable nature, and expounds on their artistic and scientific successes. These virtues, together with their wealth and their close connection with the Lombard kings, are also cited in support of Milan's pre-eminence among the cities of northern Italy. The poet then lists the many saints, martyrs and bishops buried within the city, stating that they are responsible for Milan's prosperity.

The poet goes on to praise the Lombardian monarch, Liutprand, who reigned from 712 to 744, as well as the city's bishop, Theodore II, who died in 735. Aside from this mention of Liutprand, the poet does not refer to the state of Lombardy. The poem concludes with a prayer.

The subject matter is typical of later medieval Christian urban eulogies. It expresses the unknown author's sense of civic pride. The choice of topics and their organisation follow the classical scheme of a eulogy to a city, originating in Ancient Greece and commonly practised in Ancient Rome. The poet might have followed an 8th-century guide to the form called De laudibus urbium, adapting it to his Christian perspective. He does not seem to have been inspired by Ausonius's earlier poem.

Several scholars have suggested that the Laudes Mediolanensis civitatis might be the contribution of Milan, the ecclesiastical capital of Italy, to a literary rivalry with the royal capital, Pavia. Nicholas Everett has pointed out that Milan is described as "the queen of towns, mother of the realm ... who bears the eminent title of metropolis. The immense dignity of her power endures, so that all the bishops of ancient Italy [presules Ausoniae] come to her to be instructed according to the dictates of canon law." Pavia also had a canon law school. Giovanni Battista Pighi (it), one of the poem's editors, and Gina Fasoli (it) have argued that the poem inflates Milan's contemporary importance by a set of clever overstatements; for example, it was not the "urbs regia" and had not been the administrative capital since the end of the 4th century. The poem's opening also stresses that Milan's name stretched back into antiquity, while Pavia was then known by two different names, "Papia" and "Ticinum".

== The Verona encomium ==
The poem appears to have been the inspiration for a eulogy to Verona, known variously as the Versus de Verona, Laudes Veronensis or Veronae Rythmica Descriptio, dated to around 796–800, which follows a very similar plan and contains numerous borrowed phrasings. The Milanese encomium is written in polished Latin and has a more consistent, more regular prosody than the Veronese poem. It emphasises the characteristics of the city's inhabitants, and omits details of defunct Roman edifices such as the theatre and circus.

The English historian J. K. Hyde considers that neither Laudes Mediolanensis civitatis nor the Verona poem was a significant influence on the later evolution of the genre of urban descriptions, many of which were written in prose.

== Modern critical reception ==
The poem was first edited by the German historian Ernst Dümmler in 1881. A modern edition was prepared by G. B. Pighi in 1960. It is discussed in early reviews of medieval descriptions of cities by Margaret Schlauch (1941) and Hyde (1966).

Hyde notes the "originality" of the poem's subject matter and method of treatment but describes its execution as "technically competent, but no more than mediocre" and "cold and wooden". Italian academic Paolo Zanna praises the poem's "very logical" organisation, and writes that the classical eulogy structure has been transformed into a "powerful and skilfully composed profession of the Italian civic pride." Diego Zancani, a specialist in Italian literature, writes that the poem displays "the consciousness of belonging to a privileged place."

== See also ==
- List of literary descriptions of cities (before 1550)
