= Antiquities =

Objects from antiquity, especially the civilizations of the Mediterranean

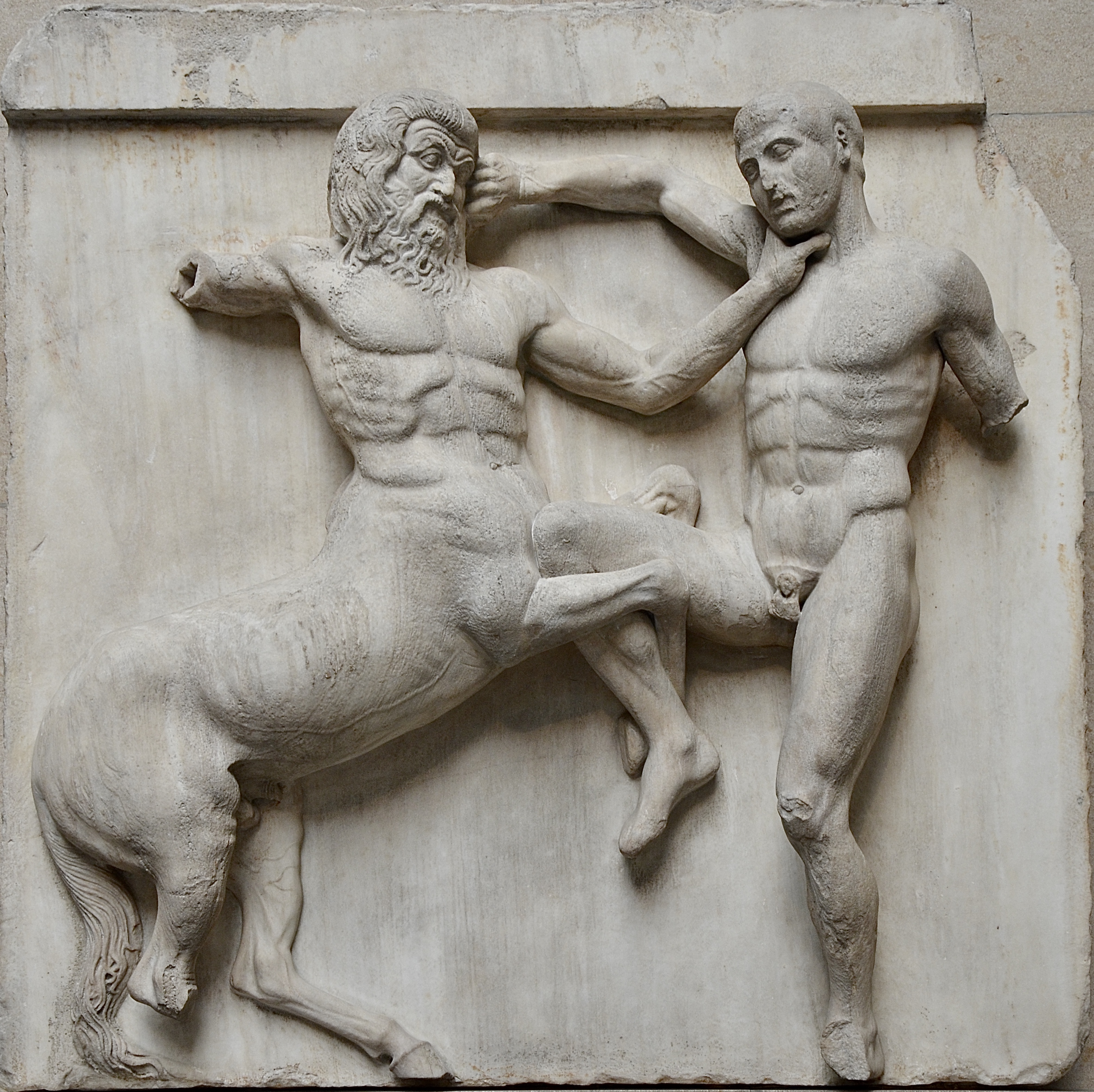
A centaur struggling with a Lapith on a metope from the Parthenon, in the British Museum (London), part of the Elgin Marbles

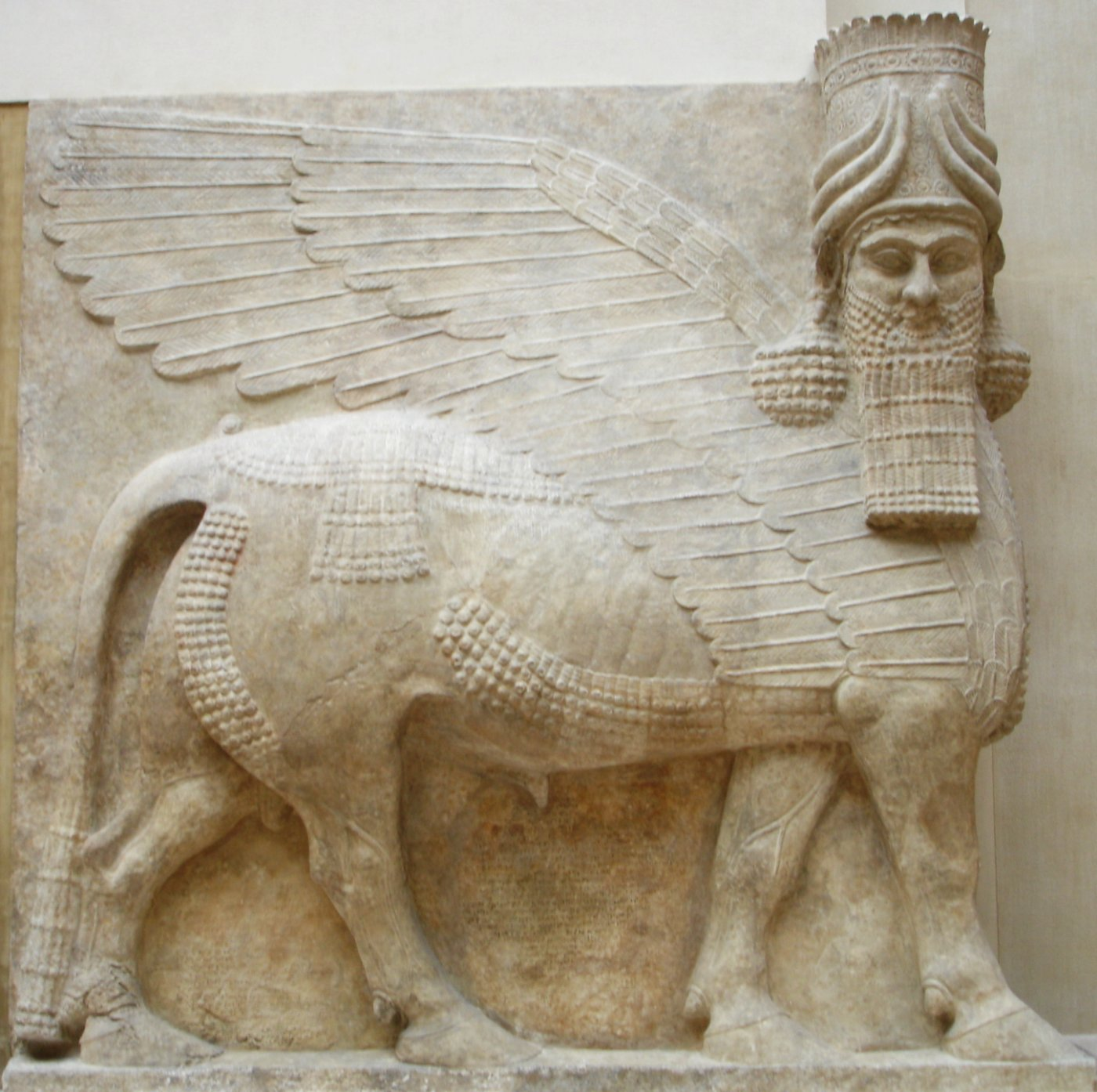
An Assyrian lamassu in the Louvre

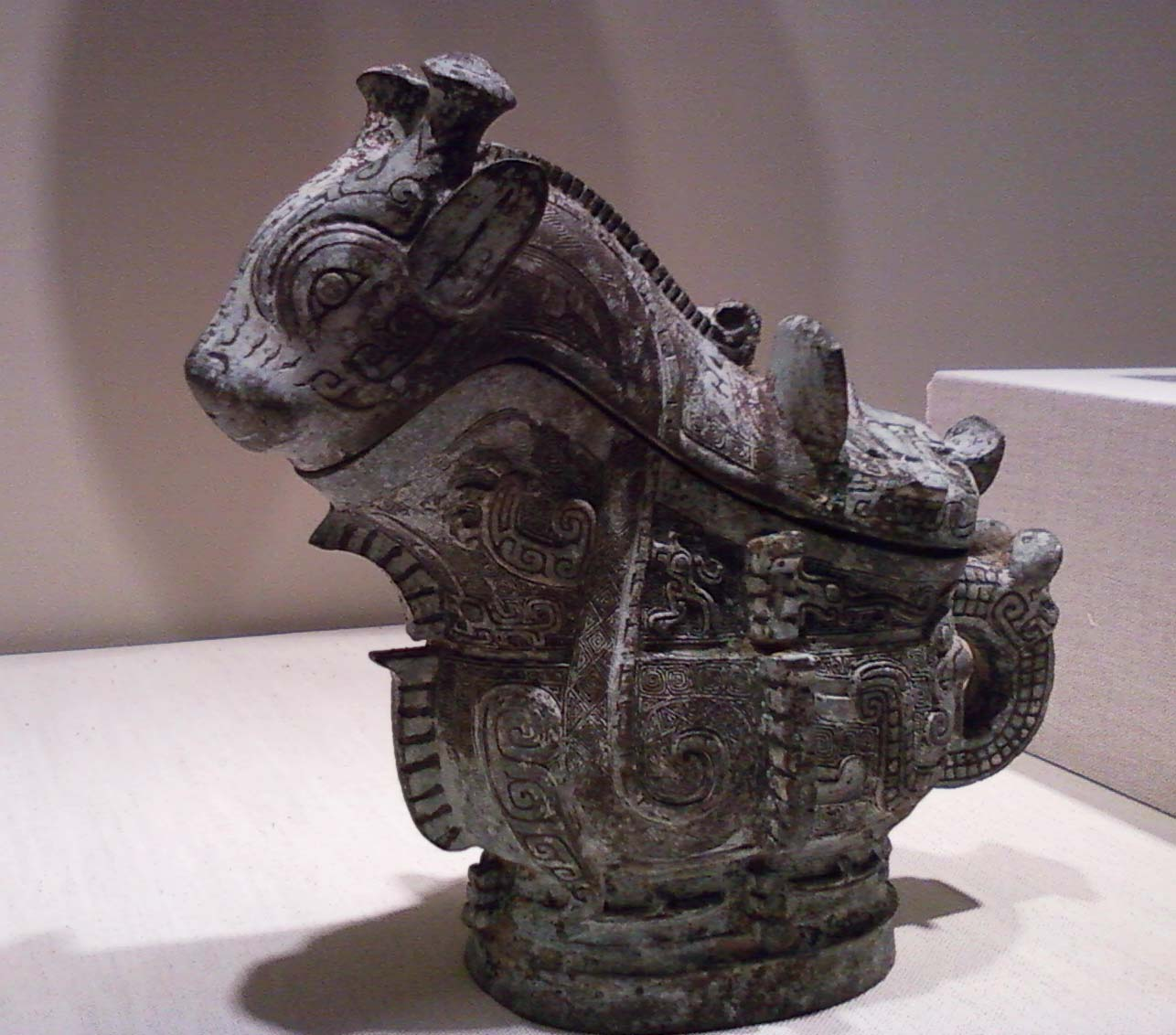
Chinese ritual wine server (guang), circa 1100 BC

Antiquities are objects from antiquity, especially the civilizations of the Mediterranean such as the Classical antiquity of Greece and Rome, Ancient Egypt, and the other Ancient Near Eastern cultures such as Ancient Persia (Iran). Artifacts from earlier periods such as the Mesolithic, and other civilizations from Asia and elsewhere may also be covered by the term. The phenomenon of giving a high value to ancient artifacts is found in other cultures, notably China, where Chinese ritual bronzes, three to two thousand years old, have been avidly collected and imitated for centuries, and the Pre-Columbian cultures of Mesoamerica, where in particular the artifacts of the earliest Olmec civilization are found reburied in significant sites of later cultures up to the Spanish Conquest.

A person who studies antiquities, as opposed to just collecting them, is often called an antiquarian.

== Definition ==
The definition of the term is not always precise, and institutional definitions such as museum "Departments of Antiquities" often cover later periods, but in normal usage Gothic objects, for example, would not now be described as antiquities, though in 1700 they might well have been, as the cut-off date for antiquities has tended to retreat since the word was first found in English in 1513. Non-artistic artifacts are now less likely to be called antiquities than in earlier periods. Francis Bacon wrote in 1605: "Antiquities are history defaced, or some remnants of history which have casually escaped the shipwreck of time".

The art trade reflects modern usage of the term; Christie's "Department of Antiquities" covers objects "from the dawn of civilization to the Dark Ages, ranging from Western Europe to the Caspian Sea, embracing the cultures of Egypt, Greece, Rome and the Near East." Bonhams use a similar definition: "...4000 B.C to the 12th Century A.D. Geographically they originate from Egypt, the Near East and Europe ..." Official cut-off dates are often later, being unconcerned with precise divisions of art history, and using the term for all historical periods they wish to protect: in Jordan it is 1750, in Hong Kong 1800, and so on.

The term is no longer much used in formal academic discussion, because of this imprecision. However, a recent attempt to standardise this and other terms has been carried out. Most, but not all, antiquities have been recovered by archaeology. There is little or no overlap with antiques, which covers objects, not generally discovered as a result of archaeology, at most about three hundred years old, and usually far less.

== History ==
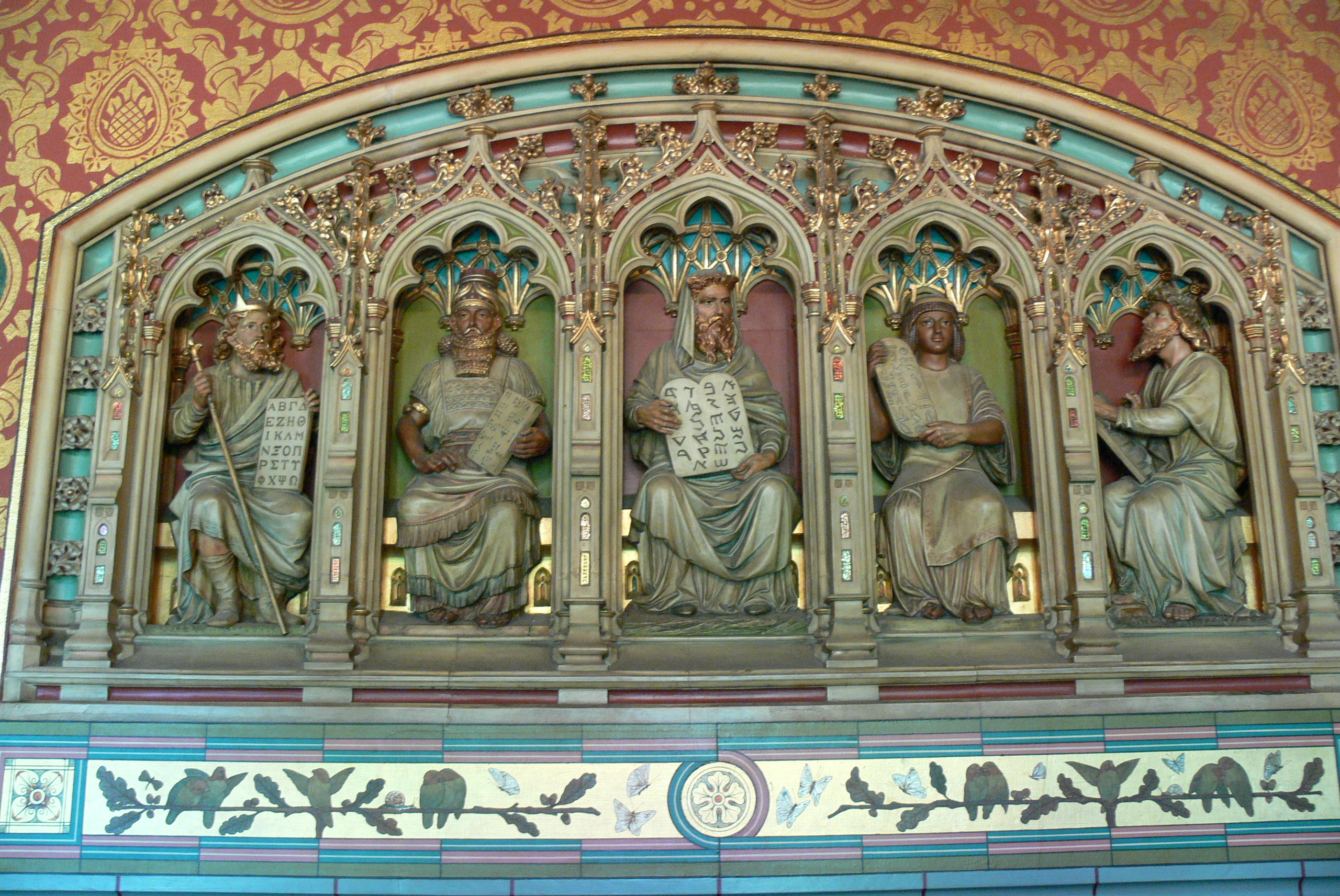
Allegories of five literatures of antiquity, relief at Cardiff Castle, by Thomas Nicholls circa 1870

The sense of antiquitates, the idea that a civilization could be recovered by a systematic exploration of its relics and material culture, in the sense used by Varro and reflected in Josephus' Antiquities of the Jews was lost during the Middle Ages, when ancient objects were collected with other appeals, the rarity or strangeness of their materials or simply because they were thought to be endowed with magical or miraculous powers. Precious cameos and other antique carved gems might be preserved when incorporated into crowns and diadems and liturgical objects, consular ivory diptychs by being used as gospel covers. Roman columns could be re-erected in churches. sarcophagi could receive new occupants and cinerary urns could function as holy water stoups. Sculptural representations of the human form, feared and reviled as "idols" could be rehabilitated by reidentifying their subjects: the equestrian bronze Marcus Aurelius of the Campidoglio was respected as a representation of the Christian emperor Constantine, and in Pavia the Regisole acquired a civic role that preserved it. In Rome the Roman bronze Spinario was admired for itself by the guidebook writer Magister Gregorius. The classicism of the Carolingian Renaissance was in part inspired by appreciation of Late Antique manuscripts: the Utrecht Psalter attempts to recreate such a Late Antique original, both in its handwriting and its illustrations.

Many museums hold these artifacts and keep them safe so that we have access to the knowledge they hold about the past. On September 2 the National Museum of Brazil was engulfed in flames. This event caused many artifacts to be lost forever.

== Trading ==
Trading of antiquities can be legal or illegal. The looting of archaeological sites or museums to supply the black market in antiquities poses a grave threat to the world's cultural heritage. Irreplaceable archaeological information may be lost.

== See also ==
- Ancient art
