= Madonna and Child (Signorelli) =

C. 1492 painting by Luca Signorelli

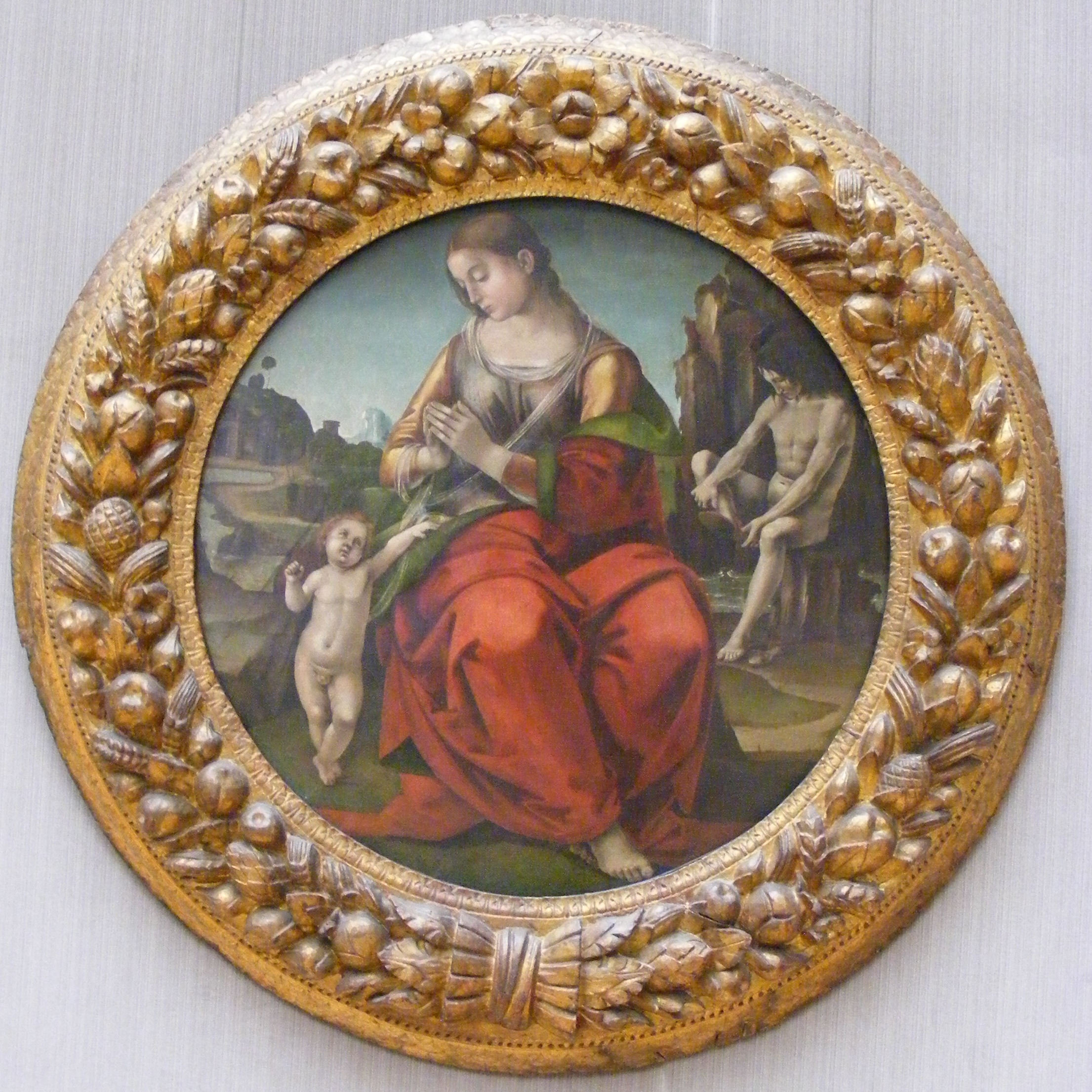
Madonna and Child (c. 1492–1493) by Luca Signorelli

Madonna and Child is a tempera on panel tondo painting by Luca Signorelli, created c. 1492–1493, now in the Alte Pinakothek in Munich. The rocky landscape in the background shows the influence of Leonardo da Vinci, whilst to the right is a nude seated on a rock, referencing the marble Spinario, which at that date was already in the Uffizi in Florence.
