= De laude Cestrie =

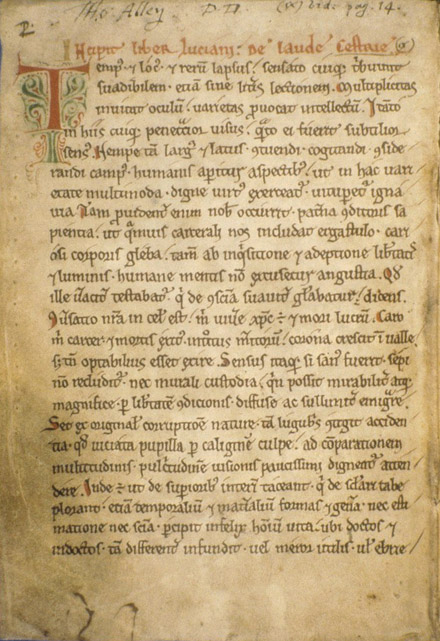
Initial folio of De laude Cestrie

De laude Cestrie ("On the Glory of Chester"), also known as Liber Luciani de laude Cestrie ("The Book of Lucian in Praise of Chester" (Note: Mark Faulkner, in a review of Barrett 2009, corrects the Latin version of the title.)), is a medieval English manuscript in Latin by Lucian of Chester, probably a monk at the Benedictine Abbey of St Werburgh in Chester. Believed to date from the end of the 12th century, it has been described as "the oldest extant piece of Cheshire writing," and, with its first-hand description of the medieval town of Chester, is one of the earliest examples of prose writing about an English urban centre. It is also notable for the earliest extended description of Chester's county palatine status, which Lucian writes "gives heed ... more to the sword of its prince than to the crown of the king." The original manuscript is held by the Bodleian Library, Oxford. Excerpts have been published in 1600, 1912 and 2008.

== Manuscript ==
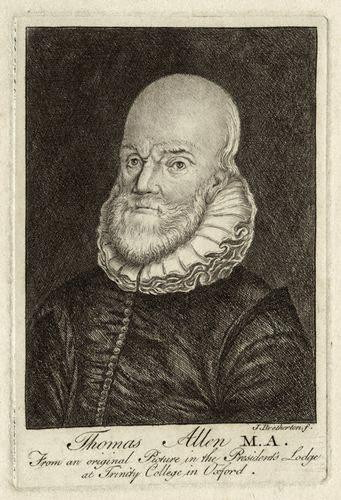
Thomas Allen, who presented the manuscript to the Bodleian in 1601

De laude Cestrie is known from a single copy, MS Bodley 672, held by the Bodleian Library in Oxford, which is believed to be the original copy written by Lucian. It was presented to the Bodleian in 1601, together with eighteen other manuscripts collected by Thomas Allen (1542–1632). Its previous history and how Allen acquired it are unknown, but it is possible that it remained at St Werburgh's until 1539/40, when the library's texts were dispersed on the abbey's dissolution.

The manuscript is a book, in its original binding, of 198 (Note: Barrett 2009 states 195 but Faulkner, in a review of Barrett 2009, states that the correct figure is 198.) parchment leaves which are 150 mm by 110 mm, with 23–26 lines per page. One or more leaves are missing from the end. It has been dated at around 1194–97, around 1195 or 1195–1200. Robert W. Barrett, Jr, describes it as "the oldest extant piece of Cheshire writing." The manuscript is in prose form, and is a little over 82,000 words long. The opening has a decorated initial in red and blue. There are marginal annotations, which might be by Lucian or another monk at St Werburgh's. These refer to events in 1199–1200.

== Author, style and audience ==
Nothing beyond the text is known of the manuscript's author, Lucian. From the emphasis of the text, he is generally assumed to have been a monk at St Werburgh's Abbey in Chester, possibly the sub-prior or scriptor. Mark Faulkner has suggested he might have been a monk at the Cistercian Combermere Abbey. Lucian writes that he was not born in the town and states that he was educated at St John the Baptist's Church. He was inspired to write De laude Cestrie by one of St John's canons, whom he refers to as his patron. Lucian writes for both residents of Chester and travellers, and appears to have intended the work to be used as a guidebook, at one point recommending that readers should study "the text with one eye and the streets with the other." Barrett argues that the main audience is likely to be educated clerics of the town, who, unlike the majority of the lay-people, would be able to read Latin. Lucian's Latin is described by Faulkner as "self-consciously filigree", and employs several rare words.

== Contents ==
De laude Cestrie provides a first-hand account of the town of Chester and its associated county at the end of the 12th century, under Ranulf de Blondeville (1170–1232). It is among the earliest surviving prose descriptions of an English urban centre, as well as of an urban eulogy (encomium urbis) in praise of an English town. An earlier example praising London, Descriptio Nobilissimae Civitatis Londoniae, was written by William fitz Stephen in 1173–75. (Alcuin's Latin poem to York dates from the late 8th century; a 12th-century Old English poem to Durham and another in Latin to Chester, quoted in a 14th-century work, are also known.) The form dates back to Quintilian in the 1st century AD, and was propagated by handbooks by Priscian and others, which Faulkner argues Lucian would probably have read. Lucian cites many classical authors including Horace, Ovid, Seneca and Virgil, as well as the Bible and Geoffrey of Monmouth.

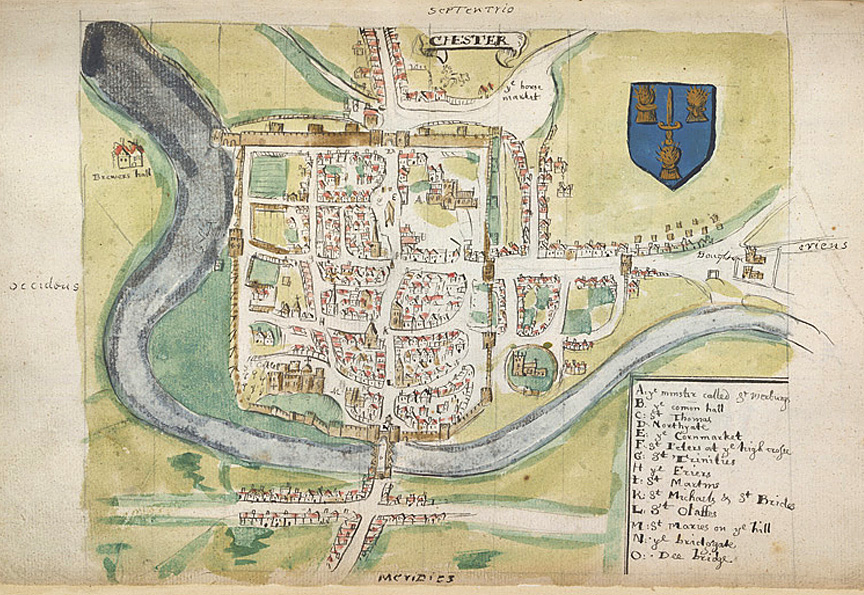
A 1588 plan of post-medieval Chester, showing the town walls, gates and crossing streets that Lucian describes

Lucian documents a county that has already acquired a distinct regional identity, differentiated not only from Wales but also from the adjacent areas of England. He describes the people of Chester as being generally similar to the Welsh (Britons), "through a long transfusion of morals." He gives the earliest extended description of the county of Chester's special administrative position, later formalised as the county palatine or palatinate, whereby the Anglo-Norman Chester earldom took on the power of the English crown, writing:

[E]nclosed on the other side by the borders of the Forest of Lyme, the province of Chester is, by a certain distinction of privilege, free from all other Englishmen. By the indulgence of kings and the eminence of earls, it gives heed in the assemblies of its provincials more to the sword of its prince than to the crown of the king. Within their jurisdiction, they treat matters of great importance with the utmost freedom.

A marginal note adds "the earl is obeyed, the king is not feared."

The etymology of Chester's Latin name, Cestria, is given as "threefold" (cis tria), and Lucian repeatedly organises material into triples, which Barrett suggests may refer to the Trinity. Lucian gives the derivation of the English name as being "camp of God" (Dei castra), which is similar to the modern etymology from castra.

The text describes the town's walls with their four gates, the two crossing streets and the central market. Lucian's observations often come from an imagined aerial perspective. The text documents international trade, with ships carrying wine and other goods arriving at the port from Aquitaine, Ireland, Germany and Spain, as well as goods by land including grain, fish and cattle from England, Ireland and Wales, respectively. Lucian makes an extensive comparison of Chester with Rome, and also draws parallels with Jerusalem. Outside Chester's walls, he describes three roads leading to Christleton (identified with Christ), Aldford and the sanctuary for criminals of Hoole Heath (the valley of demons).

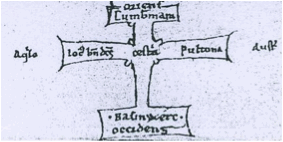
Marginal diagram showing Chester surrounded by four Cistercian monasteries

Unlike William fitz Stephen's work on London, De laude Cestrie concentrates on religious rather than secular aspects of his chosen town. Lucian describes Chester via Biblical parallels; according to Barrett, "the city's streets and buildings become scripture made manifest." Faulkner describes the text as "perhaps the fullest application of this Neo-Platonic theology to survive from the Middle Ages." Barrett and Keith D. Lilley highlight several instances where Lucian distorts Chester's geography to suit his rhetorical purposes.

More than half of the manuscript addresses the roles and characteristics of the town's monks, nuns and clerks. It focuses particularly on the monastery of St Werburgh, the nunnery dedicated to St Mary, and the town's three churches, St John the Baptist's, St Peter's and St Michael's. St Werburgh's name is given as meaning "the one defending the city"; Lucian gives an apparently eye-witness account of the fire of 1180, which he states was extinguished when St Werburgh's shrine was carried in procession through the streets. Lucian describes the monastery of St Werburgh's role in providing hospitality to visitors to the town. He also mentions four Cistercian abbeys outside the town, Combermere, Pulton and Stanlaw in Cheshire and Basingwerk in Wales, with a marginal diagram indicating how the four delineate a cross with Chester at the centre. The text goes on to describe the general organisation of church and monastery, with details on the roles of the abbot, prior and sub-prior, and concludes with an examination of the afterlife and the Day of Judgement.

== Publication history and critical reception ==
Extracts from the manuscript were published by William Camden in 1600, as part of his Britannia, a survey of Great Britain and Ireland. The Chetham Society discussed producing an edition in 1843, which never came to fruition. In 1906, the Bodleian's librarian Falconer Madan rediscovered the manuscript.

The classical archaeologist Margerie Venables Taylor prepared a greatly abridged edition, incorporating only about 9% of the text, which was published by the Record Society of Lancashire and Cheshire in 1912. Her edition focuses on the parts of the manuscript relating to the geography and history of Cheshire and its environs. Taylor disliked Lucian's style, writing that "[m]etaphor and allegory are worked to death", and she lacked interest in the religious aspects of the text, which she described as "one long sermon disguised as a guide-book". Several 20th-century reviewers of this edition, including Kenneth Hyde and Elizabeth Danbury, criticised the style, reliance on allegory and quality of the Latin.

More-appreciative analyses of the manuscript have appeared in the 21st century by Robert Barrett Jr, Catherine Clarke, John Doran, Mark Faulkner and others. Another edition was prepared in 2008 by Faulkner for the Mapping Medieval Chester Project, again as a series of excerpts incorporating only 8% of the text, with a parallel English translation.

== See also ==
- History of Cheshire
- History of Chester
- List of literary descriptions of cities (before 1550)
