= Burgundio of Pisa =

Italian jurist and scholar (died 1193)

Burgundio of Pisa, sometimes erroneously styled "Burgundius", was a 12th-century Italian jurist. He was an ambassador for Pisa at Constantinople in 1136. He was a professor in Paris, and assisted at the Lateran Council in 1179, dying at a very advanced age in 1193.

== Scholarly works ==
He was a distinguished Greek scholar, and is believed on the authority of Odofredus to have translated into Latin, soon after the Pandects were brought to Bologna, the various Greek fragments which occur in them, with the exception of those in the 27th book, the translation of which has been attributed to Modestinus.

The Latin translations ascribed to Burgundio were received at Bologna as an integral part of the text of the Pandects, and form part of that known as The Vulgate in distinction from the Florentine text.

In addition, he translated from Greek into Latin Exposition of the Orthodox Faith by John of Damascus, the third part of his Fountain of Wisdom, upon the request of Pope Eugene III; On human nature by Nemesius of Emesa; Galen's On complexions; Books 6-8 (on winemaking) of the Geoponica; and homilies on Matthew and John by John Chrysostom, as well as the first Latin translation of Aristotle's Nicomachean Ethics (Ethica vetus).

== Biography ==
From 1135 to 1140, he lived in Constantinople, the main center of knowledge in the Greek world at the time. In the Byzantine capital, he participated in the philosophical dispute of 1136 along with James of Venice and Moses of Bergamo. Back in Italy, he proposed to Frederick Barbarossa that he have numerous Greek works translated. He had numerous pupils, including Rolando da Lucca and Uguccione.

According to the Pisan calendar he died on October 30, 1194, at a very old age.

== Bibliography ==
- P. Classen, Burgundio von Pisa. Heidelberg, 1974.
