= Encomium =

Latin word meaning "the praise of a person or thing"

Encomium (pl.: encomia) is a Latin word deriving from the Ancient Greek enkomion (ἐγκώμιον), meaning "the praise of a person or thing." Another Latin equivalent is laudatio, a speech in praise of someone or something.

Originally it was the song sung by the chorus at the κῶμος, or festal procession, held at the Panhellenic Games in honour of the victor, either on the day of his victory or on its anniversary. The word came afterwards to denote any song written in celebration of distinguished persons, and in later times any spoken or written panegyric whatever.

Encomium also refers to several distinct aspects of rhetoric:

- A general category of oratory
- A method within rhetorical pedagogy
- A figure of speech praising a person or thing, but occurring on a smaller scale than an entire speech
- The eighth exercise in the progymnasmata series
- A literary genre that included five elements: prologue, birth and upbringing, acts of the person's life, comparisons used to praise the subject, and an epilogue

- The basilikos logos (imperial encomium), a formal genre in the Byzantine empire

The classical model of the encomium typically followed the form:

1. Exordium: Call the audience to virtue and rouse them to imitation of the thing praised.
2. Praise the subject's "stock," including their people, country, ancestors, and parents.
3. Praise the subject's education, artistic talent, and training in laws.
4. Praise the subject's deeds, such as their excellencies of mind, body, and fortune.
5. Favorably compare the subject to another figure commonly understood to be virtuous or praiseworthy.
6. Conclude with an exhortation or final emulation.

== Examples ==
- Gorgias' famous Encomium of Helen offers several justifications for excusing Helen of Troy's adultery
- In Erasmus' In Praise of Folly, Folly composes an encomium to herself
- De Pippini regis Victoria Avarica is a medieval encomium of the victory of Pepin of Italy over the Avars
- Encomium Emmae Reginae is a medieval encomium of Queen Emma of Normandy
- Laudes Mediolanensis civitatis or Versum de Mediolano civitate is a medieval encomium of Milan
- Versus de Verona is a medieval encomium of Verona
- Polychronion is chanted in the liturgy of Churches which follow the Byzantine Rite
- Paul the Apostle uses a kind of encomium in his praise of love, in 1 Corinthians 13; the prologue is verses 1–3, acts are v. 4–7, comparison is v. 8–12, and epilogue is 13:13–14:1.
