= Versus de Verona =

Medieval Latin poem

The Versus de Verona, also Carmen Pipinianum or Rhythmus Pipinianus (Ritmo Pipiniano), was a medieval Latin poetic encomium on the city of Verona, composed during the Carolingian Renaissance, between 795 and 806. It was modeled on the Laudes Mediolanensis civitatis (c.738), which is preserved today only in a Veronese manuscript. The anonymous Versus have been ascribed to Pacificus, archdeacon at Verona from 803 until his death in 846, but this ascription is unlikely. The poem consists of thirty-three strophes and three verses.

== Context and content ==
Contextually, the Versus were composed in a city that had undergone a recent ecclesiastical reform—under its bishops Eginus (c.780) and Ratold (799)—and the establishment of an abbey and basilica dedicated to the patron Saint Zeno outside the walls of the city and the establishment of the orthodox Cathedral of Maria Matricolare within the walls. In 799 Pippin of Italy had moved his royal court from Pavia to Verona. At the time Verona possessed newly rebuilt walls, studded with forty regular towers and eighth tall ones at the gates, referred to in lines 4–6. The poet of the Versus, probably a monk, stresses not only the glory of Verona's Christian present, but departs from his model, the Versum, to praise its pagan past: fana, tempora, constructa a deorum nomina ("its shrines and temples were built and dedicated to the gods", line 13). The monuments specifically referred to are the Roman amphitheatre and the Ponte di Pietra. The Versus can form a valuable source for early medieval Verona, since the city was partially destroyed by the earthquake of 3 January 1117.

In lines 22–24, the Veronese poet does lament the evil of the city's pagan founders. Thereafter the Versus is dedicated to the thirty-five saints, forty martyrs, and twelve apostles associated with Verona. The list of Veronese bishops after line 40 does not appear to be based on the earlier Sermo de Vita S. Zenonis or Vita Zenonis, but is similar to a list of bishops embroidered on the Velo di Classe of bishop Anno (c.760). The return of the relics of Firmus and Rusticus, which had first been taken to Africa, then to Capodistria and finally to Trieste, before bishop Anno brought them back around 760 and re-buried them in their original sarcophagus, inspired reference to these saints. The anonymous poet, in competition with Milan, lists some Milanese saints (lines 63–64) and some cities which praise Verona, "the gateway to the bounds of Liguria": Aquileia, Mantua, Brescia, Pavia, Rome, and Ravenna; Milan is notably omitted.

== Linguistic analysis ==
The anonymous poet was inventive in his use of language. He praises Verona in line 2 for its pre-eminence among the cities in partibus Venetiarum, ut docet Isidorus, "in the area of the Veneto, as Isidore teaches." In fact, Isidore teaches no such thing, and the plural form Venetiarum is an invention of the poet. In general, the poet's non-classical usages contrast with his evident learnedness. His verses are marked by "syllabic irregularities" among other anomalies.

The Versus are sometimes classified as "popular" poetry, on the basis of their vulgarisms. This generally assumes that the poet was writing in an uneducated manner, but this is unsatisfactory in the case of the Veronese writer, who often deliberately moves away (grammatically) from his source. Rather, the poet is constructing a Latin more accessible to his clerical audience, based on their spoken Latin. There is a parallel between this and the similar vulgarising of Paulinus II of Aquileia.

== See also ==
- List of literary descriptions of cities (before 1550)
