= Nemesius =

Late 4th century Greek philosopher and bishop of Emesa

Nemesius of Emesa (Ancient Greek: Νεμέσιος Ἐμέσης; Latin: Nemesius Emesenus; fl. c. AD 390) was a Christian philosopher, and the author of a treatise Περὶ φύσεως ἀνθρώπου or De natura hominis ("On Human Nature"). According to the title of his book, he was the bishop of Emesa (modern-day Homs, Syria). His book is an attempt to compile a system of anthropology from the standpoint of Christian philosophy; it was very influential in later Greek, Arabic and Christian thought.

Nemesius was also a physiological theorist. He based much of his writing on previous work of Aristotle and Galen, and it has been speculated that he anticipated William Harvey's discovery of the circulation of blood. Other views included a five-theory hierarchy of divine providence. These theories are developed from an earlier Platonic theory.

Nemesius was one in a succession of advocates, from Herophilus and Erasistratus onward, of the idea that different cavities of the brain were responsible for different functions. His Doctrine of Ventricle Localisation of Mental Functioning is a reconciliation of Platonic doctrines on the soul with Christian philosophy and also emphasized Greek scientific interpretation and knowledge of the human body.

== Biography ==
Little information is available on Nemesius' life except that he was the bishop of Emesa. Even his date is uncertain, though a rough indication is given by some internal evidence that points to a time after the Apollinarian controversy and before the strife that is connected to Eutyches and Nestorius (the second quarter of the fifth century). There is evidence that supports that he was well read in the writings of Galen and may have had some medical training. What remains very unclear in his writing is the interplay between the Christianity of his published writings and the Hellenism of his education. It is noteworthy that a bishop should be so interested in Hellenistic thought.

Nemesius may be the same person as the pagan of the same name to whom Gregory of Nazianzus addressed four letters and a protreptic poem. This Nemesius, a lawyer, was the governor of Cappadocia Secunda around 386–87, when Gregory invited him to become a Christian.

== De natura hominis ==
Nemesius is best known for his book De natura hominis ("On Human Nature" or "On the Nature of Man"). Nemesius' book also contains many passages concerning Galenic anatomy and physiology. Establishing that mental faculties are localized in the ventricles of one's brain was the main principles of his work.

Nemesius is also well known for his theories of divine providence, a theory that has been debated over the years. It was inspired by Plato. Nemesius considers providence as somewhat of a concern with particulars and those of universals. He states that it is the work of divine providence as the reason why everyone looks different from one another. He states that without divine providence nobody would be recognizable from the other.

=== First theory of providence ===
This theory of Nemesius, describes that the structure of the universe is a whole, termed the "world-soul" (anima mundi). The world-soul consists of the heavenly gods (the stars, the planets, and the earth). It also includes the immortal, rational parts of the souls of the mortal creatures. He leaves the mortal creation parts of the souls and bodies up to the heavenly gods. The next three theories of divine providence that Nemesius suggests are arranged as a Hierarchy.

=== Hierarchy of the three levels of providence ===
The primary providence is that of the supreme God. It is concerned with the heavens and the rational souls. The secondary providence is recognizable by the influence of heavenly bodies on the order of the coming of perishable things and the preservation of natural things. The tertiary providence in the hierarchy concerns daemons concerning the actions of man.

=== Fourth theory of providence ===
In Nemesius' fourth theory of providence he describes that there are certain things that can be attributed neither to mind nor to the nature of things. The mind is concerned with the things that we are responsible, and providence is concerned with those things that we are not responsible for.

=== Fifth theory of providence ===
Nemesius' final theory of providence regards those who say that God is concerned for the continuity of things, but not with the particular of things.

== Doctrine of Ventricle Localisation ==
Nemesius also contributes a Doctrine of Ventricle Localisation of Mental Functions. This doctrine, as a following of earlier platonic theory, identifies that all sensory perception were received in the anterior area of the brain. This area is now known as the Lateral-Ventricles. This area was then later termed the sensus communis and is the region where all sensory perceptions were held in common. These were held by a force identified as the faculty of imagination.

The middle or also known as the Third Ventricle was termed the region of the faculty of intellect. This is the area that was responsible for controlling the judging, approving, refuting, and assaying of the sensory perceptions which are gathered in the lateral ventricles. The third faculty was identified as memory, and the storehouse of all sensory perceptions after they had been judged by the faculty of intellect. Nemesius believed that the faculties operated through the agent of an animal spirit produced after it had been carried through a network of arteries. This network was referred as the Rete Mirabile and is located at the base of the brain. Nemesius' doctrine of ventricle localisation of mental functions was greatly acknowledged but was later attacked by Brengarioda Carpi, and then by Vesalius and Varolio in 1543 and 1573.

== Subsequent influence ==
In the sixth century, little attention seems to have been paid to De Natura Hominis. Maximus the Confessor is the first writer to quote the work, in his Ambigua (written between 628 and 634). The ecclesiastical writer Anastasios Sinaites incorporated excerpts into his Questions and Answers. Then, in 743 John of Damascus incorporated extensive excerpts in his writing De fide orthodoxa, though without naming Nemesius as the author. This was translated into Latin by Burgundio of Pisa around 1153. The Byzantine author who most used Nemesius' work was the eleventh-century writer Michael Psellos.

For many subsequent centuries, De natura hominis was attributed to Gregory of Nyssa. This erroneous attribution was common in the Middle Ages in the Syriac, Armenian, Greek and Arabic traditions, as well as in the Latin-speaking scholarly world of the West. So, among others, Albert the Great and Thomas Aquinas assumed that Gregory was the author. Gregory's high reputation contributed to the popularity of the work, which is reflected in the number of manuscripts: there are, for example, over one hundred Greek manuscripts known.

De natura hominis was itself translated into Latin by Alphanus of Salerno around 1080. This translation was used in the twelfth century by scholars such as Adelard of Bath, William of Conches and William of St Thierry, and then by Albert the Great in the thirteenth century. A second Latin translation was made by Burgundio of Pisa around 1165. This was used by Peter Lombard, Albert the Great and Thomas Aquinas.

By these various channels, Nemesius' thought had a great influence on medieval discussions concerning the passions.

== Other people named Nemesius ==
- One of the seven sons of St. Symphorosa, named Nemesius, was martyred with her c. 138 AD.
- Saint Nemesius, Roman Catholic saint of Alexandria in Egypt, became a martyr in 307 AD. He was brought to court accused of being a thief (through slander), and was later acquitted. Later, in a persecution during the time of the emperor Decius, was denounced as a Christian to a judge Aemilianus. The judge ordered him racked with intense tortures and burned, alongside accused thieves.

== Editions of Nemesius' De natura hominis ==
- Antwerp, 1575; Oxford, 1671; Halle, 1802; Migne PG, vol 40. Versions: Latin by Alsanus, ed. Holzinger (1887)
- Nemesius, The Nature of Man, tr. George Wither (London, 1636) [the first English translation]
- Bender, Untersuch. Liber Nemesius (1898)
- Nemesius of Emesa, Premnon Physicon a N. Alfano in Latinum translatus, ed. K Burkhardt (Leipzig: Teubner 1917) [an edition of the eleventh-century Latin translation made by Alphanus of Salerno in c1080, with accompanying original Greek text]
- Nemesius of Emesa, On the Nature of Man, in Cyril of Jerusalem and Nemesius of Emesa, ed. by W. Telfer (Philadelphia: Westminster Press, 1955) [a modern English translation with introduction and notes]
- De natura hominis Némésius d'Émèse; traduction de Burgundio de Pise; édition critique avec une introduction sur l'anthropologie de Némésius par G. Verbeke et J.R. Moncho (Leiden : E. J. Brill, 1975) [an edition of the twelfth-century Latin translation by Burgundio of Pisa, with critical matter in French]
- Nemesii Emeseni, De natura hominis, ed. Moreno Morani (Leipzig, Bibliotheca Teubneriana, 1987)
- Nemesius, On the Nature of Man. Tr. by Philip van der Eijk & R.W. Sharples, Translated Texts for Historians (Liverpool, Liverpool University Press, 2008).
- Nemezjusz z Emezy, O naturze ludzkiej, trans. from Greek by Andrzej Kempfi, (Instytut Wydawniczy PAX, Waszawa 1982).

== See also ==
- Apocatastasis
- Pneuma (Stoic)
