= Ieuan ap Gruffudd Leiaf =

Ieuan ap Gruffudd Leiaf was a Welsh uchelwr and bard, the son of poet Gruffudd Leiaf. His poetry, spanning the period c.1420 to c. 1470, has been fully edited. The earliest dateable poem that can be confidently assigned to him are a cywydd in praise of Gwilym ap Gruffudd ap Gwilym ap Gruffudd ap Heilin (d. 1431) and his newly built home, Y Penrhyn, Llandygái (built c. 1420). The context of this poem seems to be the tradition of the'cyff clêr', with Ieuan, a 'prifardd', answering the taunts of lesser bards. Rhys Goch Eryri was present at the celebration and composed a perhaps more well-known praise poem to Y Penrhyn and its owner. Shortly after this, Ieuan composed a cywydd satiring the River Llugwy, into which the poet fell on his way to Y Penrhyn one Christmas. A cywydd to Saint Anna, mother of the Virgin Mary and two other daughters also named Mary, attributed to Ieuan in the only manuscript in which it survives, could also be from the same period or earlier.

Dating to around 1450 is a cywydd by Ieuan in praise of Hywel ab Ieuan Fychan ab Ieuan Gethin and his wife Elen of Moelyrch, Llansilin. Moelyrch was destroyed during the Glyndŵr Rising, probably at the same time as nearby Sycharth, the home of Owain Glyndŵr himself, and the poem celebrates the rebuilding of Hywel's home. This was almost certainly the occasion of the 'ymryson' (bardic contention) between Guto'r Glyn (who was also present at the celebration and presented a praise poem there) and Ieuan ap Gruffudd Leiaf. Dafydd ap Siencyn ap Dafydd ab y Crach, a man of great stature and daring, was an 'uchelwr' who supported the Lancastrians during the Wars of the Roses. Ieuan composed a praise poem to Dafydd while the latter was an outlaw on Carreg y Gwalch above Llanrwst. This poem probably dates to the 1460s. Dafydd succeeded in keeping the Yorkist forces out of Nantconwy until 1468. Also probably dating to the 1460s is a poem by Ieuan in praise of the plantation town of Aberconwy and its beer.

Although a number of 'cywyddau brud' are attributed to Ieuan by some copiers, there is only one for which the attribution can be regarded as reasonably secure, and this is a cywydd in the form of a conversation between the bard and eog Llyn Llyw, one of the 'oldest animals'. It is difficult to date this poem from the content.

Ieuan ap Gruffudd Leiaf had two sons, Robert Leiaf and Syr Siôn Leiaf. They were both poets, and their poetry has also been edited.
