= Laudatio florentinae urbis =

Laudatio florentinae urbis (Latin for "Praise of the City of Florence") is a panegyric delivered by Leonardo Bruni (c. 1403–4). The panegyric is modeled after Aelius Aristides' Panathenaic Oration, particularly with references to Florence's values and external threats. It was first delivered immediately after Florence's victory over Milan.

The panegyric contains chronological contradictions with Bruni's other oration, Dialogi.

The exact dating of the oration, as with other works of Bruni's dated by Hans Baron, has been questioned by critics of Baron. Some portions of the panegyric employed in its dating include references to the "occupation" of Bologna (June 1402, or rumors of collusion between Milan and Bologna in 1399) and the fading of Giangaleazzo Visconti (died 2 September 1402) from Milan's political scene.

Bruni republished the panegyric in the 1430s at a time which the pope was contemplating transferring the Council of Florence to a different city; the republication was also contemporaneous with the Milanese panegyric of Pietro Candido Decembrio, De Laudibus Mediolanesium Urbis Panegyricus (1436).

== See also ==
- Civic humanism
- List of literary descriptions of cities (before 1550)
