= Gruffudd Leiaf =

15th-century Welsh poet

Gruffudd Leiaf was a 15th-century Welsh poet, known almost exclusively from his works. He was reputed to descend from the royal family of Gwynedd.

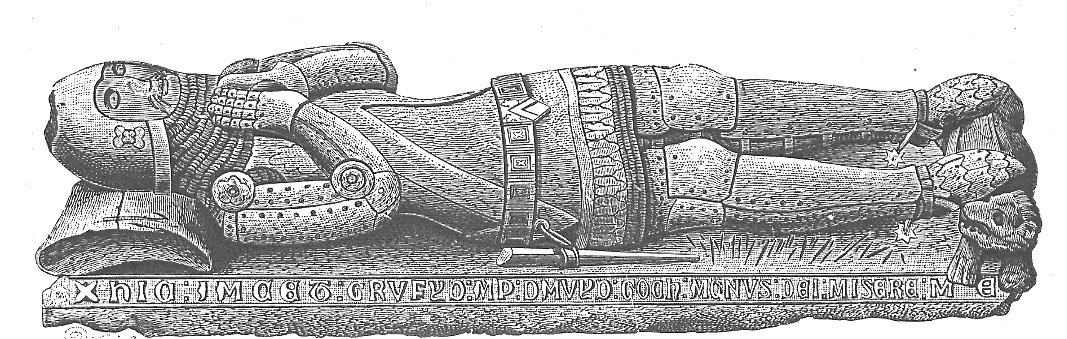
Monument to Gruffudd ap Dafydd Goch in the former Church of St Michael and All Angels, Betws-y-Coed

Gruffudd Leiaf was born in Denbighshire, the son of Gruffudd Fychan, in turn son of Welsh knight Gruffudd ap Dafydd Goch, who served on a 1352 jury and died c. 1370, buried at the church of Betws-y-Coed where his burial monument survives. The reputed father of this earliest Gruffudd, Dafydd Gogh of Penmachno, was claimed by later genealogies to have been an illegitimate son of Dafydd ap Gruffydd, who briefly reigned as the last native Prince of Wales prior to his 1283 execution, though no contemporary evidence of such a son survives. Gruffudd Fychan had nine children by his wife Wladus ferch Gruffudd of Llifon, Anglesey, including sons Hywel Coetmor, Rhys Gethin, Robert and Gruffudd Leiaf, who with their father were accused in 1390 of preventing non-Welsh-speaking parson William Broun from taking up his parish at Llanrwst, and they were summoned before king Richard II of England and his council, so Gruffudd Leiaf and his brothers were presumably adults at the time. The sons would serve as executors of their father's will in March 1397.

An englyn written by Gruffudd Leiaf survives in two copies, among the Cwrtmawr manuscripts and in the National Library of Wales. A second work, a cywydd to the owl, has also been attributed to him by some manuscripts, though others attribute this work to other poets, his kinsmen Siôn Leiaf and Robert Leiaf, or the unrelated Daffydd ap Gwilym.

Gruffudd was founder of a family of related Welsh poets. A large body of poetic work is attributed to his son, Ieuan ap Gruffudd Leiaf, while Ieuan's son "Syr" Siôn Leiaf and probable son Robert Leiaf, were also poets, and later poet Huw Machno (fl. 1585–1637) of Penmachno was also a reputed descendant of Daffydd Goch and hence akin to Gruffudd Leiaf.
