= Panegyric =

Public speech in praise of a person

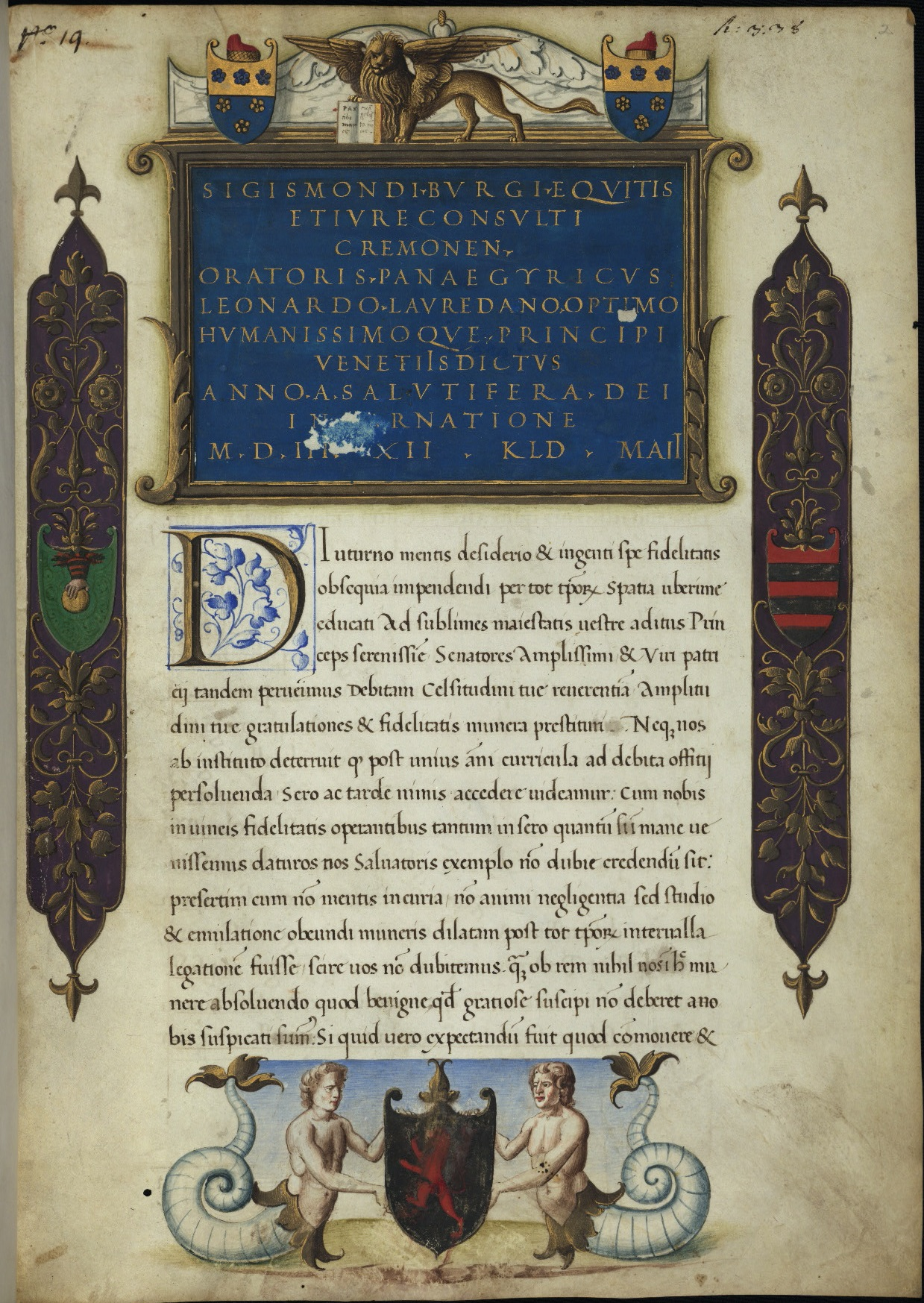
Title page of the Panegyric of Leonardo Loredan (1503), created in honour of Leonardo Loredan, 75th Doge of Venice, now in the Walters Art Museum in Baltimore

A panegyric (US: /ˌpænɪˈdʒɪrɪk/ or UK: /ˌpænɪˈdʒaɪrɪk/) or praise poem is a formal public speech or written verse, delivered in high praise of a person or thing. The original panegyrics were speeches delivered at public events in ancient Athens.

== Etymology ==
The word originated as a compound of Ancient Greek: παν- 'all' (the form taken by the word πᾶν, neuter of πᾶς 'all', when that is used as a prefix) and the word Ancient Greek: ἄγυρις, romanized: ágyris 'assembly' (an Aeolic dialect form, corresponding to the Attic or Ionic form Ancient Greek: ἀγορά, romanized: agorá). Compounded, these gave Ancient Greek: πανήγυρις, romanized: panḗgyris 'general or national assembly, especially a festival in honour of a god' and the derived adjective Ancient Greek: πανηγυρικός, romanized: panēgyrikós 'of or for a public assembly or festival'. In Hellenistic Greek the noun came also to mean 'a festal oration, laudatory speech', and the adjective 'of or relating to a eulogy, flattering'. The noun Ancient Greek: πανήγυρις, romanized: panḗgyris had been borrowed into Classical Latin by around the second century CE, as panēgyris 'festival' (in post-Classical usage also 'general assembly'). Correspondingly, Classical Latin also included the adjective panēgyricus, which appears meaning 'laudatory', but also came to function as a noun, meaning 'public eulogy'. These words inspired similar formations in European languages in the early modern period, such as French panégyrique, attested by 1512. The English noun and adjective panegyric seems to have been borrowed from the French word, but no doubt with cognisance of its Latin and Greek origins.

== Classical Greece ==
In Athens such speeches were delivered at national festivals or games, with the object of rousing the citizens to emulate the glorious deeds of their ancestors. The most famous are the Olympiacus of Gorgias, the Olympiacus of Lysias, and the Panegyricus and Panathenaicus (neither of them, however, actually delivered) of Isocrates. Funeral orations, such as the famous speech of Pericles in Thucydides, also partook of the nature of panegyrics.

== Roman Empire ==
The Romans generally confined the panegyric to the living—with the deceased receiving funeral orations instead. The most celebrated example of a Latin panegyric, however, is that delivered by the younger Pliny (AD 100) in the Roman Senate on the occasion of his assumption of the consulship, which contained a eulogy of Trajan. Towards the end of the 3rd and during the 4th century, as a result of the orientalizing of the Imperial court by Diocletian, it became customary to celebrate as a matter of course the superhuman virtues and achievements of the reigning emperor, in a formally staged literary event. In 336, Eusebius of Caesarea gave a panegyric of Constantine the Great on the 30th year of his reign, in which he broke from tradition by celebrating the piety of the emperor, rather than his secular achievements. A well-delivered, elegant and witty panegyric became a vehicle for an educated but inexperienced young man to attract desirable attention in a competitive sphere. The poet Claudian came to Rome from Alexandria before about 395 and made his first reputation with a panegyric; he became court poet to Stilicho.

Cassiodorus, magister officiorum of Theodoric the Great, left a book of panegyrics, the Laudes. One of his biographers, James O'Donnell, has described the genre thus: "It was to be expected that the praise contained in the speech would be excessive; the intellectual point of the exercise (and very likely an important criterion in judging it) was to see how excessive the praise could be made while remaining within boundaries of decorum and restraint, how much high praise could be made to seem the grudging testimony of simple honesty".

In the Byzantine Empire, the basilikos logos was a formal panegyric for an emperor delivered on an important occasion.

== Arabic ==
Panegyric poems were a major literary form among the Arabs. Writing in the Arabic language, Al-Mutanabbi wrote about Sayf al-Dawla's celebrated campaign against the Byzantine Empire.

== Persia ==
Persian language panegyric poems from the Middle Ages contain details on the life of court poets and their patrons, and shed light on contemporary attitudes and matters of political and military interest such as Farrukhi Sistani's qasida on Ghaznavid ruler Mahmud of Ghazni's incursion against the Somnath temple. Poems were composed for festivals like Eid al-Fitr, Nowruz and Mihragan. Some poems depicted the patron as a hero in a battle between Islam and infidels. Wars against Muslims required additional explanations and some poems by Farrukhi and Mu'izzi advocated in favor of Mahmud's capture of Rayy and Ahmad Sanjar's attacks against the Ghaznavid ruler Arslan-Shah in 1117. These poems are important sources for the Great Seljuq period from which few records survive.

In a panegyric poem address to Mahmud of Ghazna, Firdausi said: "Noble buildings are ruined by rain and by the heat of the sun./I have laid the foundations of a high palace of poetry which will not be damaged by wind and rain." This is similar to the grandiose claims of the Roman poet Horace who says, in an address to the Emperor Augustus, that his poetry was more lasting than bronze and grander than the pyramids.

== Africa ==
African oral tradition includes panegyric customs such as praise names and praise poetry. Often these customs serve mnemonic and genealogical functions within the continent's numerous ethnic groups, and are usually also tied to tribal spirituality.

Examples include Oriki amongst the Yoruba people, Isibongo amongst the Zulu people, and Iziduko amongst the Xhosa people.

== Modern revival ==
The custom of panegyrics addressed to monarchs was revived in the Baroque period, though there do exist Renaissance examples such as Bruni's Laudatio florentinae urbis to Florence of 1403, and Erasmus's Panegyricus, first published in 1504. Thus, in 1660, several panegyrics were published by English poets in honour of Charles II of England coming to power. Another significant work includes the "Panegyric for the Duke of Lerma", written by the Spanish poet Luis de Góngora in 1617. Russian poets of the eighteenth century, most notably Mikhail Lomonosov, adopted the panegyric form to celebrate the achievements of Russian emperors and empresses.
