= Daniel Waley =

British historian, archivist and academic (1921–2017)

- Born: 20 March 1921; Notting Hill, London
- Died: 26 May 2017 (aged 96)
- Occupation: Professor

Academic background
- Education: University of Cambridge
- Thesis: Mediaeval Orvieto: The political history of an Italian city state, 1157–1334 (1950)
- Doctoral advisor: David Knowles
- Other advisor: Charles Previté-Orton

Academic work
- Discipline: Medieval History
- Sub-discipline: Italian history, military history, biography
- Institutions: London School of Economics (1950–1972), British Library (1972–1986)
- Main interests: Medieval Italian communes
- Notable works: The Italian City-Republics

Daniel Philip Waley FBA (20 March 1921 in London – 26 May 2017) was a British historian, manuscript specialist, and professor. He was best known for his enduring textbooks on medieval Italy and Europe.

== Biography ==
Waley began his education in Dorking. He graduated in 1938 from Dauntsey's School near Devizes, where he developed a life-long passion for cricket, and won a scholarship to study history at King's College, Cambridge. In his first year of university (1938/9), he took the six-month Cours de Civilisation Française at the Sorbonne, where he met his future wife, a student from Kent. After completing his History Prelims at King's in 1940, Waley volunteered for military service and joined the Buffs Regiment. He served with the Eighth Army in Tunisia and in the Sicilian and Italian campaigns, with attachments to the artillery and intelligence corps (as a translator). He returned in 1945 to King's College for his final year of undergraduate study and took a special subject course with David Knowles on St Francis of Assisi, having been impressed by the city in 1944. He was a contemporary of Eric Hobsbawm as a research student at King's. Waley completed his thesis on the medieval commune of Orvieto in 1950. It won him the Cambridge University Prince Consort Prize and was published unchanged in 1952. He then taught medieval and European history at the London School of Economics, University of London from 1950, initially as Assistant Lecturer in History, then Lecturer (1956), Reader (1962) and eventually Professor of History (1970). He used a three-term sabbatical in 1967–8 to write The Italian City Republics (1969), a textbook that has continuously remained in print and been translated into six languages.

In 1972 Waley left the LSE, where for some of the time he had been the lone medievalist, and was appointed Keeper of Manuscripts at the British Museum, where his son already worked in the oriental department; he transferred in 1973 to the newly formed British Library. He retired in 1991 together with his wife and the couple moved to Lewes. In 1990 he was awarded the British Academy's Serena Medal, and in 1991 he was elected a Fellow of the British Academy (FBA). In addition to the books listed below, he published numerous articles, reviews, catalogue introductions and biographical pieces. In his primary work on the urban government of medieval Italy, he dedicated much attention to the affairs of the smaller communes, among them San Gimignano.

Waley was a nephew of the orientalist and translator Arthur Waley, who held a similar position at the British Museum in the early 20th century. He married Pamela Griffiths, a wartime employee of Bletchley and later Lecturer in Hispanic and Italian Languages at Westfield College, in 1945; they had three children: Muhammed Isa (Philip), Catharine (Cat) and Harriet.

== Views and method ==
Throughout his career Waley gave priority to archival research and showed an inclination for dismantling myths through sober analysis rooted in the source material. Born into a secular Jewish family (one of his grandfathers was a member of the Fabian Society), he gave little place to religious history. His skeptical, inquisitive attitude led him to downplay the impact of ideologies, such as those of the Guelphs and Ghibellines, on social reality. The viewpoint of his works frequently represented local history and approached history from below. He sought to demystify the workings of government and warfare and recreate the popular experience of civic life in medieval Italy. His own involvement in war resulted in an enduring interest in military history. He ventured into modern history by publishing a study dissecting misconceptions around public opinion, which he started researching during his academic career, and in his later years a biography of Sydney Buxton, 1st Earl Buxton.

== Books ==
- Mediaeval Orvieto: The Political History of an Italian City-State, 1157–1334 (1952)
- The Papal State in the Thirteenth Century (1961)
- Later Medieval Europe: from Saint Louis to Luther (1964; 2nd edn. 1985; 3rd edn. with Peter Denley, 2001)
- The Italian City-Republics (1969, 2nd edn. 1978; 3rd edn. 1988; 4th edn. with Trevor Dean, 2010)
- British Public Opinion and the Abyssinian War, 1935–6 (1975)
- George Eliot's Blotter: A Commonplace-Book (1980)
- Siena and the Sienese in the Thirteenth Century (1991)
- A Liberal Life: Sydney, Earl Buxton 1853–1934, Statesman, Governor-General of South Africa (1999)
