= Basilikos logos =

A speech delivered to the emperor

In Byzantine rhetoric, a basilikos logos (Greek: βασιλικòς λόγος, literally "imperial word") or logos eis ton autokratora ("speech to the emperor") is an encomium addressed to an emperor on an important occasion, regularly at Epiphany.

The parameters of the genre were first set out in a treatise attributed to Menander Rhetor of the late 3rd century. The encomiast should praise the emperor's origins, his physical beauty, his upbringing, good habits, feats in peace and victories in war, philanthropy, good fortune and practice of the four cardinal virtues. He identified the presbeutikos, a speech of supplication given by a city to an emperor, as a subgenre of the basilikos logos. The panegyric of Constantine the Great delivered by Eusebius of Caesaria established a new convention of depicting the ideal emperor rather than the actual. The Christian basilikoi logoi dropped references to good fortune (tyche) in favour of piety. The term presbeutikos also shifted in meaning to refer to an ambassador's report.

The delivery of a basilikos logos could be used as an occasion to subtly advise the emperor, becoming a sort of "mirror of princes". This is the form it took when Agapetos praised Justinian I (6th century) and when Basil I his son Leo VI (9th century). The surviving biography of the Empress Theodora (9th century) may originate in a basilikos logos addressed to her during her regency. John the Oxite wrote and presumably delivered an unconventional logos that was highly critical of the policies of Alexios I Komnenos (11th century). Michael Italikos (12th century) wrote a logos for the Emperor John II Komnenos based primarily on his deeds and another for Manuel I Komnenos that was more conventional.

== See also ==
- Prosphonetikos logos
- Panegyrici latini

== Bibliography ==
- Gautier, Paul (1970). "Diatribes de Jean l'Oxite contre Alexis I^{er} Comnène". Revue des Études Byzantines. 28: 5–55. doi:10.3406/rebyz.1970.1427.
- Jeffreys, Elizabeth M. (2010). "Rhetoric in Byzantium". In Ian Worthington (ed.). A Companion to Greek Rhetoric. Wiley-Blackwell. pp. 166–184.
- Kazhdan, Alexander; Jeffreys, Elizabeth M. (1991). "Basilikos Logos". In Kazhdan, Alexander (ed.). The Oxford Dictionary of Byzantium. Oxford and New York: Oxford University Press. ISBN 0-19-504652-8.
