= Moses of Bergamo =

Italian linguist and poet (fl. 12th century)

Moses of Bergamo was a twelfth-century Italian poet and translator. He spent time in Constantinople, where he was one of the first Western Europeans to be interested in collecting Greek language manuscripts.

He is known for his Liber Pergamensis, a description of Bergamo in Latin verse. It is the earliest surviving example of a genre: the patriotic description of a medieval commune.
