= De mirabilibus urbis Romae =

Medieval guide in Latin to the splendours of Rome

De mirabilibus urbis Romae, preserved in a single manuscript in Cambridge, England, is a medieval guide in Latin to the splendours of Rome, which was written in the mid-twelfth century by a certain Magister Gregorius ("Master Gregory") of Oxford. The outlook here is even more secular than the Mirabilia urbis Romae, Roberto Weiss noted. Gregorius spent much of his time describing and even measuring the Roman ruins, and, according to Erwin Panofsky "had yielded so thoroughly to the 'magic spell' (magica quaedam persuasio) of a beautiful Venus statue that he felt compelled to visit it time and again in spite of its considerable distance from his lodgings". Magister Gregorius is the first to take notice of the Roman bronze called the "Spinario", then among ancient bronzes at the Lateran. Panofsky included Magister Gregorius's little book among examples of the reawakening of interest in classical antiquities evinced by a handful of connoisseurs in twelfth-century Rome. Still, like most of his contemporaries raised in familiarity with the Gothic hand, the unfamiliar Roman letters in inscriptions sometimes eluded his translation.

The fourteenth-century chronicler Ranulph Higden knew the De mirabilibus urbis Romae, for he quoted from it in book I of his universal history, Polychronicon, so extensively in fact, that his manuscripts have been useful in establishing a good text of his source. The existence of Magister Gregorius's work had been known since the mid-nineteenth century from Higden's mention of him as a source.

Magister Gregorius, known to us only from passing remarks in his Prologue, did not depend on other accounts of Rome, though he had read De septem miraculis mundi attributed to Bede. He was not a pilgrim, for he remarks on pilgrims with scorn, but a man with business at Rome, a member of an unidentified but literate group, whose members pressed him to write his account. His references to Rome's churches are brief: Old St. Peter's Basilica and the Lateran are mentioned almost in passing, and Santa Maria Rotonda (the Pantheon) for its unusual form; he paces it off and finds the structure is 266 feet wide. He refers three times to the destruction of statues by Gregory the Great and the Temple Of Minerva, "once beautiful but torn down by the great efforts of the Christians". This "document of unique value which is completely independent of the Mirabilia urbis Romae, a description of Rome by a foreign traveler written from a secular and antiquarian point of view and based primarily on personal observation supplemented by the best local tradition" was first reported to scholars by M. R. James, in 1917. The standard edition of the text with apparatus criticus is by R. B. C. Huygens (Leiden: Brill) 1970. A translation by John Osborne, The Marvels of Rome, was published in Toronto, 1987.

Gregorius opens with a personal expression of his stupefaction and wonder at the sight of the city from a distance, quoting the first lines of Hildebert's elegy on the grandeur that was Rome. After naming the city's gates he passes directly to the sculptures, in marble and in bronze, before describing the "palaces", among which he includes the Baths of Diocletian, then the triumphal arches and standing columns, before passing to burial pyramids and obelisks. The manuscript stops short, without a peroration, though the last page is not written on the verso, so that the text that has been preserved was complete as it stood.

== See also ==
- Notitia Dignitatum – Document of the Late Roman Empire
- List of literary descriptions of cities (before 1550)
