= Ordo urbium nobilium =

Latin poem in dactylic hexameter by Decimus Magnus Ausonius

Ordo Urbium Nobilium is a Latin poem in dactylic hexameter by Decimus Magnus Ausonius. It was written after a journey Ausonius took through the Roman Empire between the years 388 and 390 CE. The poem lists brief descriptions of the major cities of the Roman Empire and ranks them from the most important to the least important.

The ranking is as follows:

1. Roma (Rome).

2. Constantinopolis (Constantinople) and Carthago (Carthage).

4. Antiochia (Antioch) and Alexandria.

6. Treveris (Trier).

7. Mediolanum (Milan).

8. Capua.

9. Aquileia.

10. Arelas (Arles).

11–14. Hispalis/Emerita (Seville and Mérida), Corduba (Córdoba), Tarraco (Tarragona) and Bracara (Braga). It is unclear whether the latter three cities are ranked immediately below Emerita or are excluded from the ranking altogether.

15. Athenae (Athens).

16. Catana (Catania) and Syracusae (Syracuse).

18. Tolosa (Toulouse).

19. Narbona (Narbonne).

20. Burdigala (Bordeaux).

== See also ==
- List of literary descriptions of cities (before 1550)
