= Severo Calzetta da Ravenna =

Italian sculptor

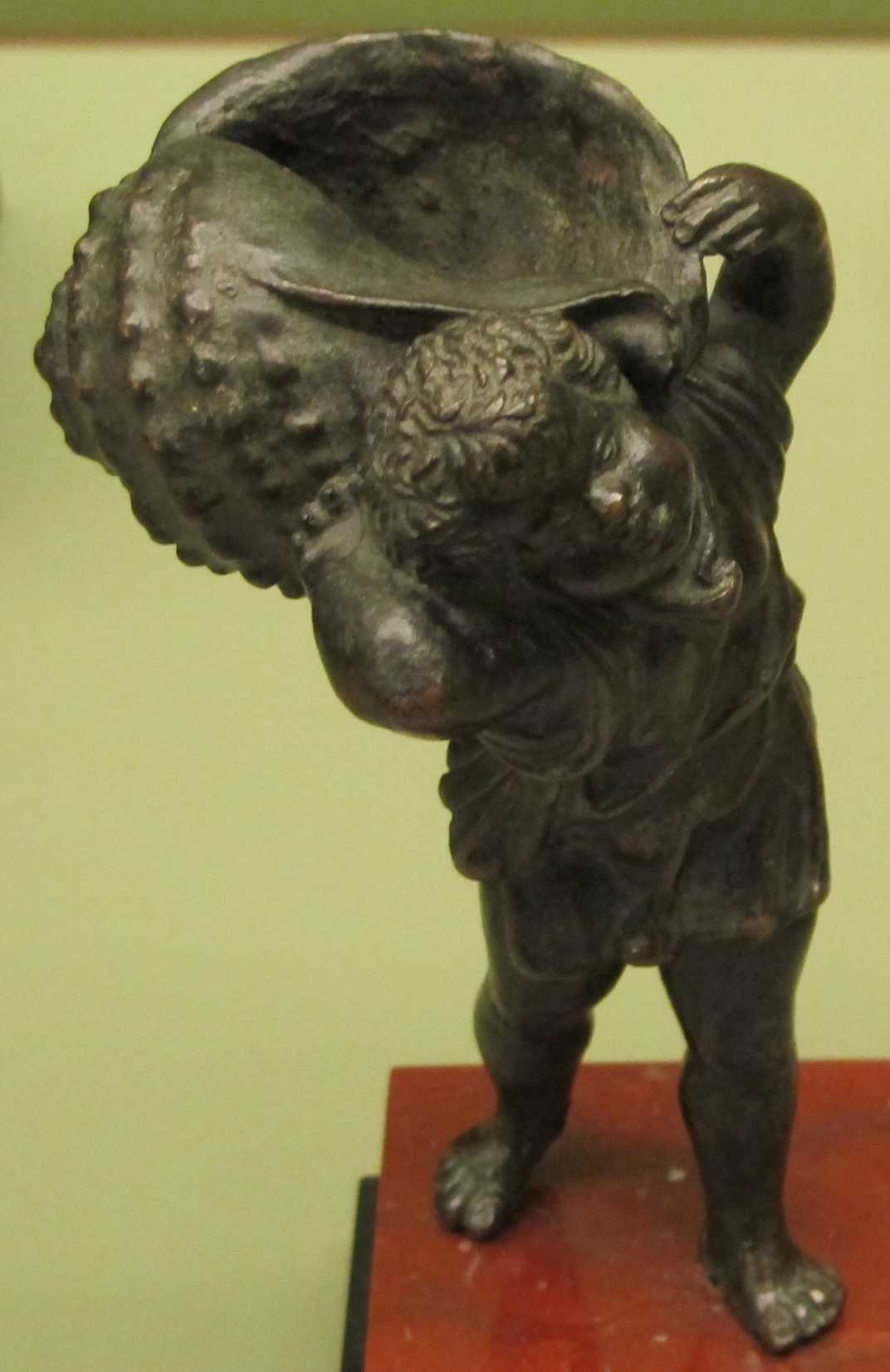
Boy carrying a shell, Bode-Museum

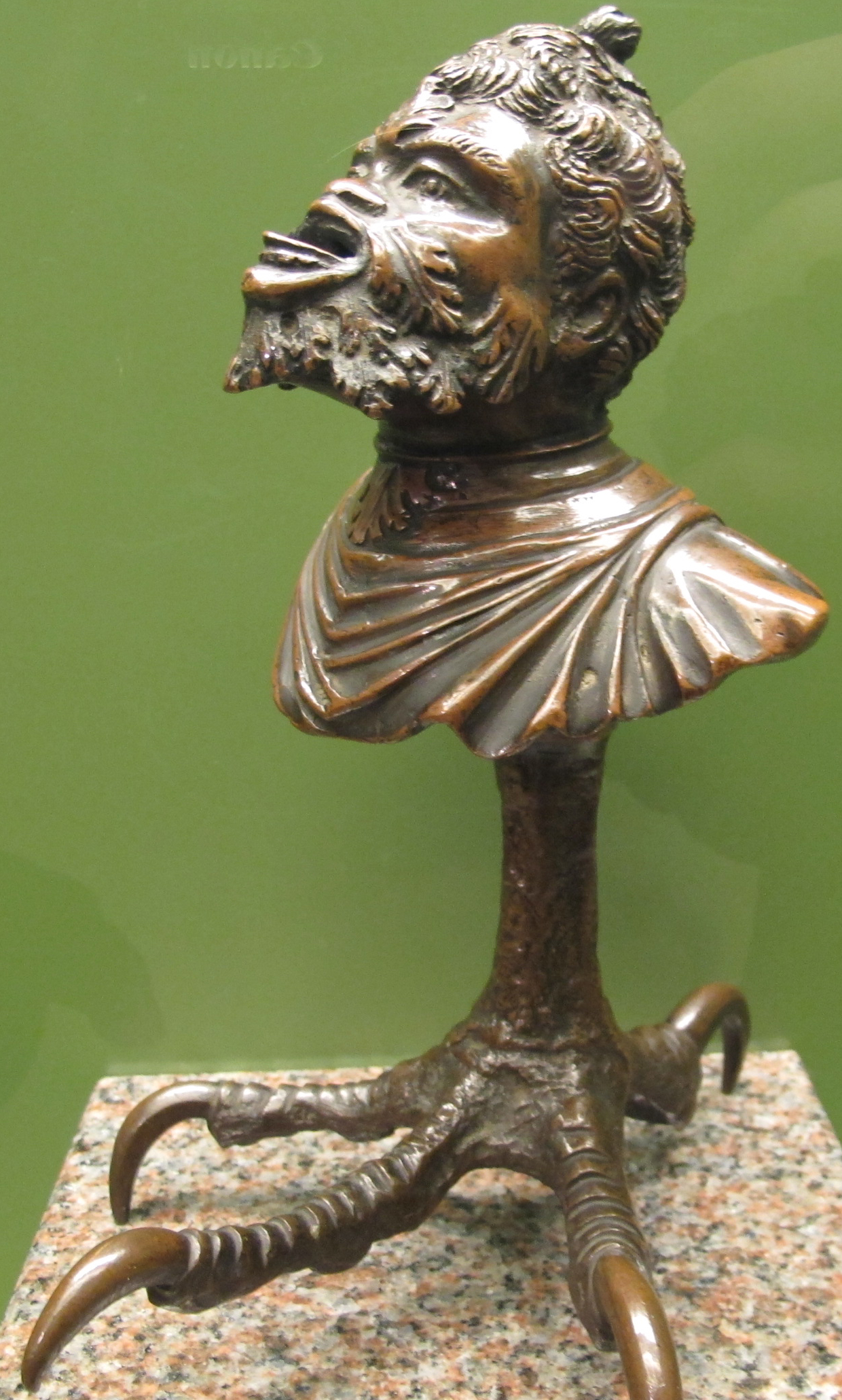
Satyr-bust-shaped oil lamp with raptor claw, Bode-Museum

Severo (Calzetta) da Ravenna or Severo di Domenico Calzetta (active ca 1496 – ca 1543) was an Italian sculptor of the High Renaissance and Mannerism, who worked in Padua, where he is likely to have finished his training, in Ferrara and in Ravenna, where he first appears in a document of 1496. Though Severo specialized in small bronzes, his only securely documented work is the marble St John the Baptist, signed by him, which was commissioned in 1500 for the entrance to the chapel of St Anthony in the Basilica of Saint Anthony of Padua and remains in place. Though he produced religious figures, such as the Corpus from a crucifix in the Cleveland Museum of Art, his main subjects were pagan, including dragons and satyrs, and functional objects, such as inkwells, candlesticks, and oil lamps. Pomponius Gauricus mentions Severo in his chapter on bronzes in De sculptura (1504), without identifying any subjects.

A mark of his convincing style all'antica is the fact that a bronze bust of a bearded man wearing a toga in the collection of the Rijksmuseum was long considered to be a Roman bronze. And a mark of the difficulty of attributions is the fact that it is attributed to Severo or to Tullio Lombardo

== Some works ==
- Neptune on a Sea Monster, c. 1500-10, bronze. Detroit Institute of Arts
- Saint Christopher Carrying the Christ Child with the Globe of the World (c. 1500/1509) The two figures had become separated, and their identities unrecognized, the Christopher mistaken for an Atlas (Louvre) and the Christ Child for a boy with a ball (National Gallery), until detective work by art historian Bertrand Jestaz reunited them .
- Saint Sebastian, c 1520, bronze (National Gallery of Art, Washington DC illustration. One of nine bronzes in the National Gallery.
