= Boy with Thorn =

Greco-Roman Hellenistic bronze sculpture

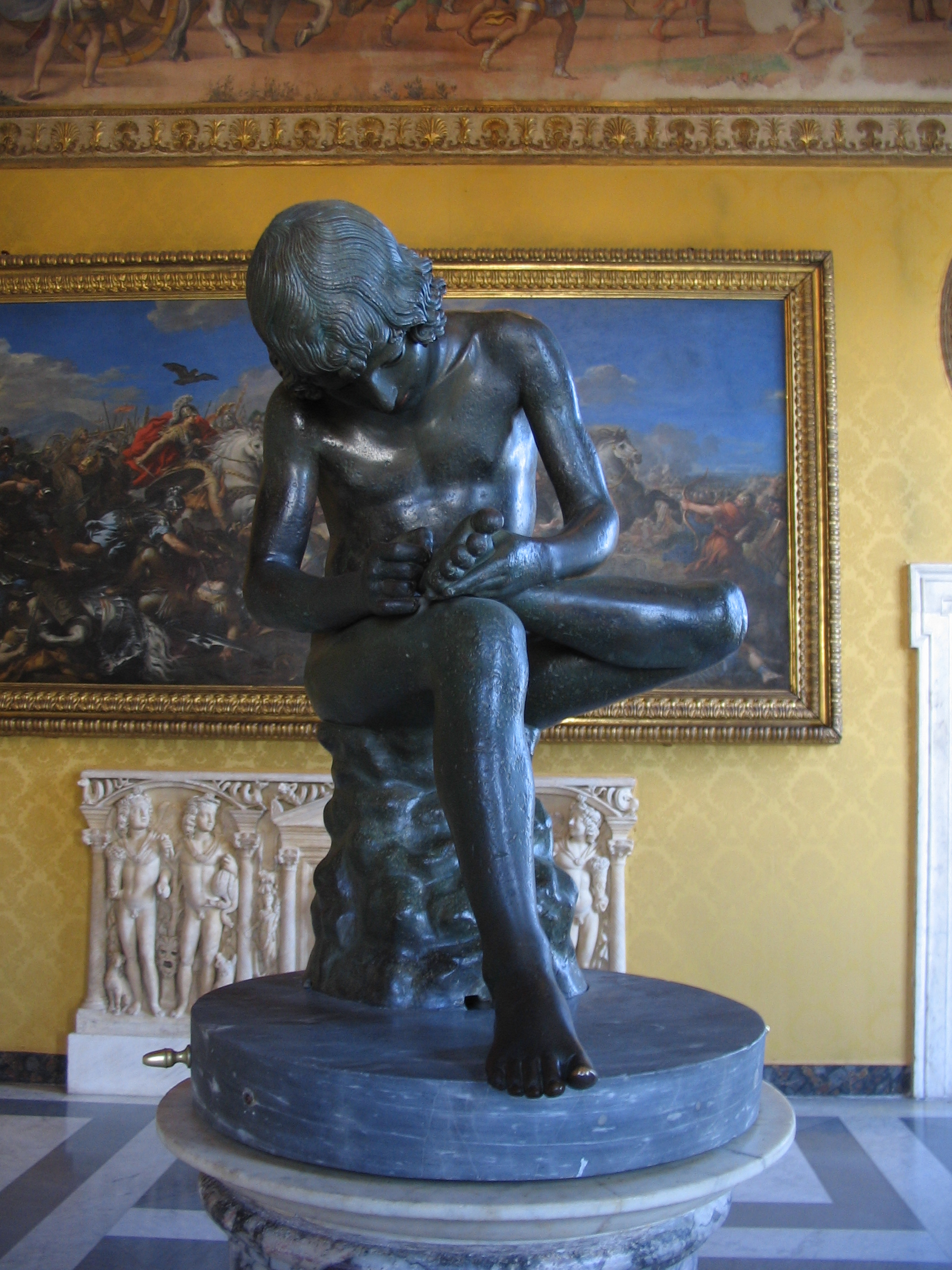
Lo Spinario (Palazzo dei Conservatori, Musei Capitolini).

Boy with Thorn, also called Fedele (Fedelino) or Spinario, is a Greco-Roman Hellenistic bronze sculpture of a boy withdrawing a thorn from the sole of his foot, now in the Palazzo dei Conservatori, Rome. There is a Roman marble version of this subject from the Medici collections in a corridor of the Uffizi Gallery, Florence.

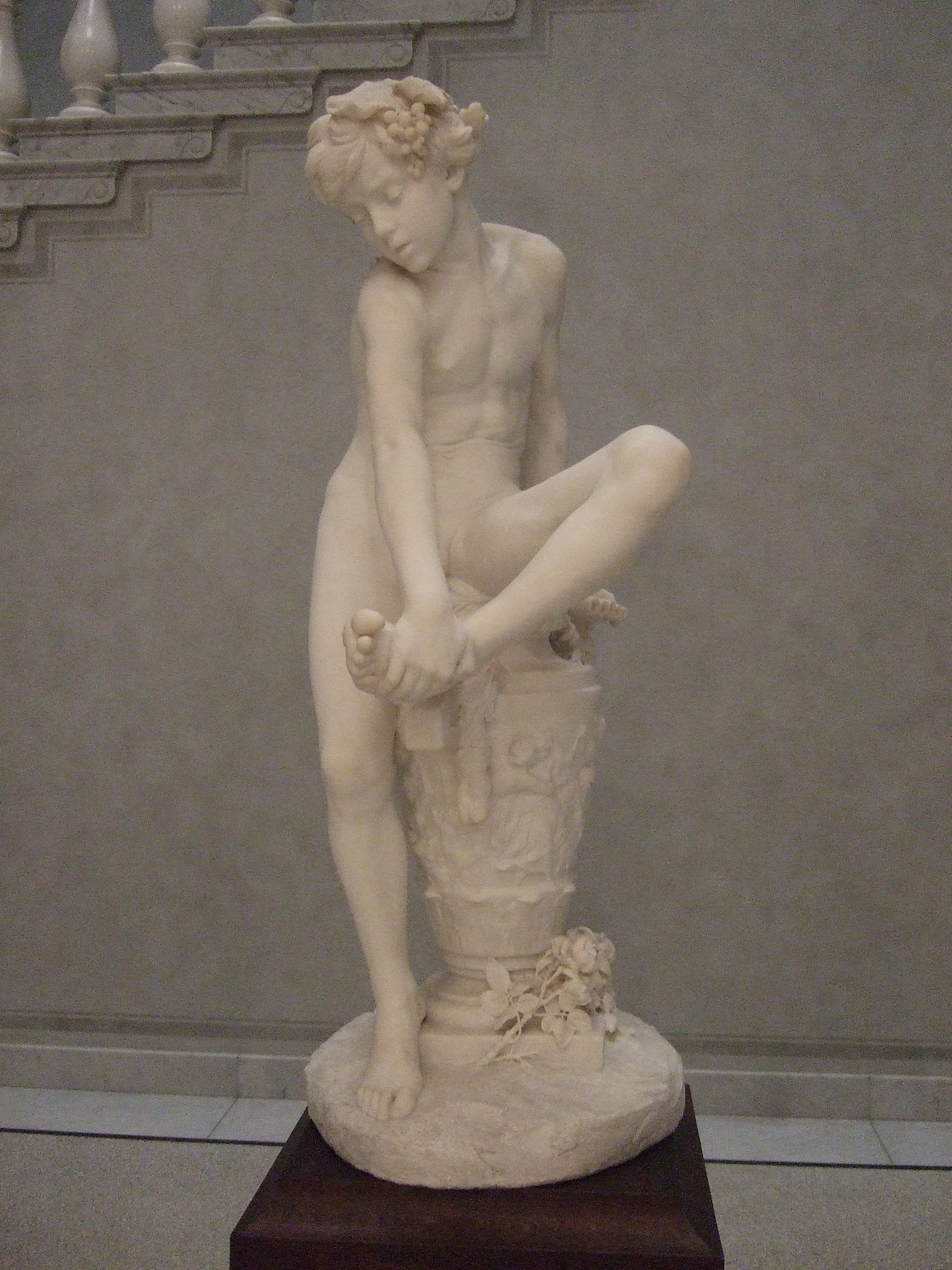
Dornauszieher ("thorn puller") by Gustav Eberlein between 1879 and 1885. Alte Nationalgalerie, Berlin.

== History ==
The work was standing outside the Lateran Palace when the Navarrese rabbi Benjamin of Tudela saw it in the 1160s and identified it as Absalom, who "was without blemish from the sole of his foot to the crown of his head." It was noted around 1200 by the English visitor, Magister Gregorius, who noted in his De mirabilibus urbis Romae that it was a highly ridiculous statue called Priapus. It must have been one of the sculptures transferred to the Palazzo dei Conservatori by Pope Sixtus IV in the 1470s, though it is not recorded there until 1499–1500.

In the Early Renaissance, it was celebrated through being one of the first Roman sculptures to be copied. There are bronze reductions by Severo da Ravenna and Jacopo Buonaccolsi (called "L'Antico" for his refined, classicizing figures). Buonaccolsi made a copy for Isabella d'Este around 1501 that is now in the Galleria Estense, Modena. He followed that work with an untraced pendant that perhaps reversed the pose. In 1500, Antonello Gagini made a full-size variant for a fountain in Messina, which is probably the bronze version that now resides in the Metropolitan Museum of Art, New York.

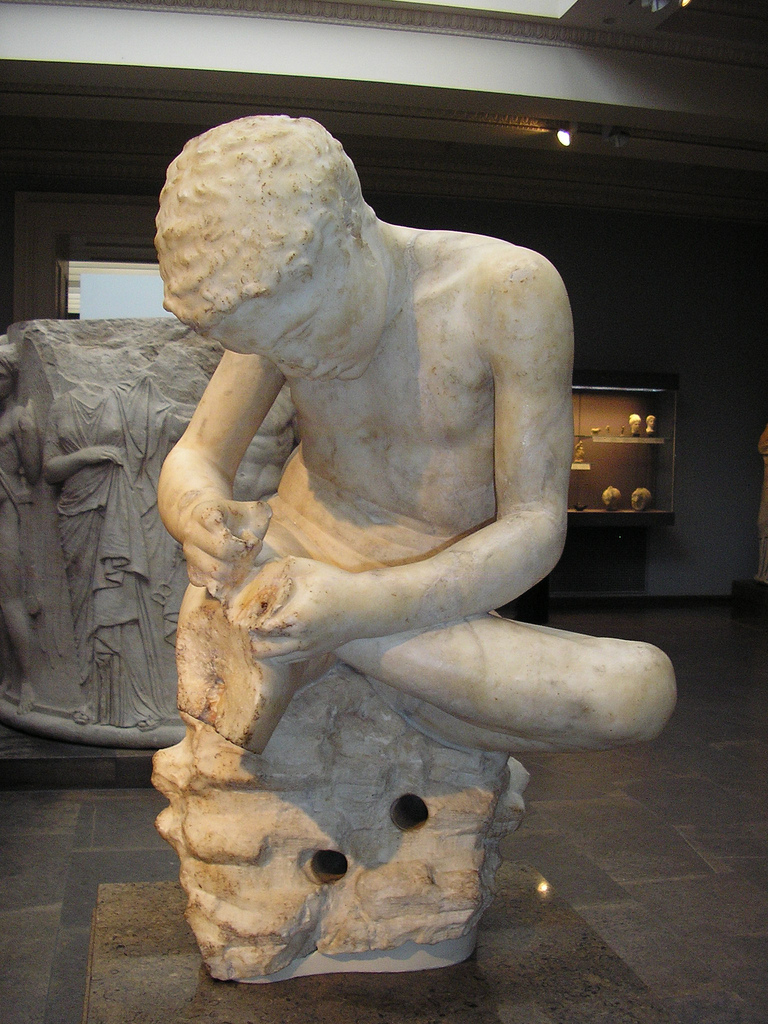
Roman marble c.25–50 AD, copy of lost 3rd century BC Hellenistic original of the type, from the Castellani collection, Rome. Said to have been found on the Esquiline. The base of the statue is worked as a rock, with a hole for a fountain pipe. (British Museum)

In the sixteenth century, bronze copies made suitably magnificent ambassadorial gifts to the King of France and the King of Spain. Francis I of France was given a version by Ippolito II d'Este. The making of this copy was overseen by Giovanni Fancelli and Jacopo Sansovino, and the transaction effected by the courtly Benvenuto Cellini. It now is held in the Musée du Louvre. Philip II of Spain received a copy from Cardinal Giovanni Ricci. In the following century, Charles I of England had a bronze Spinario made by Hubert Le Sueur.

Small bronze reductions were suitable for the less grand. A Still Life with 'Spinario' by Pieter Claesz, 1628, is conserved at the Rijksmuseum, and among the riches emblematic of the good life, it displays a small plaster model of the Spinario. Later remakes, one such example can be seen in The Oliver Mansion, South Bend Indiana.

There were also marble copies. The Medici Roman marble seems to have been among the collection of antiquities assembled in the gardens at San Marco, Florence, which were the resort of the humanists in the circle of Lorenzo il Magnifico, who opened his collection to young artists to study from. The young Michelangelo profited from this early exposure to antique sculpture. and it has been discussed whether Masaccio was influenced by the Medici Spinario or by the bronze he saw in Rome in the 1420s. However, Filippo Brunelleschi more certainly adapted the Spinario's pose for the left-hand attendant in 1401 for his bronze panel The Sacrifice of Isaac, which was his trial piece for the competition to design the doors of the Baptistery of San Giovanni.

There is a copy in the entrance lobby of Newcastle University School of Medical Science.

The formerly popular title Il Fedele ("The faithful boy") derived from an anecdote invented to give this intimate and naturalistic study a more heroic civic setting: the faithful messenger, a mere shepherd boy, had delivered his message to the Roman Senate first, only then stopping to remove a painful thorn from his foot: the Roman Senate commemorated the event. Such a story was already deflated in Paolo Alessandro Maffei's Raccolta di statue antiche e moderni... of 1704.

Taking into account Hellenistic marble variants that have been discovered, of which the best is the Thorn-Puller from the Castellani collection now in the British Museum, none of which have the archaizing qualities of the bronze Spinario, recent scholarship has tended to credit this as a Roman bronze of the first century AD, with a head adapted from an archaic prototype.

== In popular culture ==
In Thomas Mann's 1912 novella Death in Venice, Gustav von Aschenbach compares Tadzio's beauty to the Spinario.

The statue is alluded to, as being part of an auction, in the Flavia Albia novel Deadly Election by Lindsey Davis.
