= Benzo d'Alessandria =

Benzo d'Alessandria, who ended his career as head of the chancery of Cangrande Della Scala, 1325–1333, was among the earliest Italian humanists. He explored the rich library of the cathedral canons of Verona, where he (possibly) found manuscripts of Catullus and the Historia Augusta, and journeyed to Ravenna in search of Roman texts.

He poured his widespread eclectic knowledge into an encyclopedic work, begun while he was a notary for Bishop Roberto Lambertenghi at Como, 1312–20 and completed in Verona.
