= Kenneth Hyde =

English historian

John Kenneth Hyde (14 August 1930 – 10 December 1986) was an English historian, known for his research on the city in medieval Italy, and on medieval descriptions of cities. He held the chair in medieval history of the University of Manchester (1979–86).

== Early life and education ==
Hyde's family owned an iron and steel works, located at Stoke-on-Trent in 1930 when Kenneth Hyde was born. He was educated at Mostyn House on the Wirral, Cheshire, and the Oundle School, Northamptonshire, and then served in the Ordnance Corps. After his national service, he attended Worcester College, Oxford, where he graduated with a second-class degree in modern history in 1953, followed by a Diploma in Social Anthropology. His DPhil, also from Oxford, was on medieval Italy, supervised by D. M. Bueno de Mesquita.

== Career ==
Hyde researched in Padua with Paolo Sambin in the mid-1950s. In 1961, he joined the medieval history group in the history department of the University of Manchester, remaining there for the rest of his career, as assistant lecturer and then senior lecturer (1973–79). He held the chair of medieval history at the university from 1979 until his death.

He was also active in administration, serving as the chair of the university's departmental board for history, and as a member of the Royal Historical Society's council. He strove to foster interdisciplinary research and collaboration between different departments, founding a short-lived Medieval Italy Society in the 1960s and, shortly before his death, an institution that was named the J. K. Hyde Centre for Late Medieval and Renaissance Studies in his honour.

== Research ==
Medieval Italy remained Hyde's principal research area throughout his career. In his early work, he focused on social structure in cities, particularly Padua between 1256 and 1328, covering all classes except the poorest, for whom records were lacking. Later his research broadened to central and northern Italy, including rural as well as urban areas. In 1966, he published the earliest wide-ranging survey of medieval literature describing cities. His 1973 book, Society and Politics in Medieval Italy, was particularly successful. According to Brian Pullan, it "generalized elegantly, even brilliantly, about the development of medieval Italian cities and their dependencies." It was translated into Italian by Girolamo Arnaldi in 1977.

When Hyde died suddenly, his final "subtle and ambitious" work on changes in literacy and written material in late-medieval Italy was left unfinished. It included the study of newly emerging genres of literature, such as documents written by pilgrims, and diplomatic records and reports. His material was collected and edited by Daniel Waley, together with five of Hyde's earlier essays on the topic, to serve as a Festschrift. Robert Oresko writes in a review for History Today: "For a project which has been the plaything of a cruel fate, the focus is admirably clear, the argument coherent and fascinatingly nuanced."

== Personal life ==
Hyde married Maura, and the couple had three daughters. They lived near Manchester in Stockport and then Marple. His wife died in 1979, after having a stroke in 1977. Hyde died suddenly in Manchester in 1986, aged 56.

His lifelong interest in industrial history, especially watermills and canals, led him to be one of the founders of the Ellesmere Port Boat Museum, later the National Waterways Museum.

== Selected publications ==
Books

- Literacy and its Uses: Studies on Late Medieval Italy by Kenneth Hyde, Daniel Waley, ed. (Manchester University Press; 1993)
- Society and Politics in Medieval Italy: The Evolution of the Civil Life, 1000–1350 (Macmillan; 1973)
- Padua in the Age of Dante (Manchester University Press; 1966)

Research papers

- "Medieval Descriptions of Cities ". Bulletin of the John Rylands Library (1966) 48: 308–40
