= Salt War (1304) =

Venetian victory over Padua

The Salt War (Italian: guerra del sale) was a brief war between Venice and Padua over salt works in 1304. Venice was victorious and its salt monopoly was confirmed.

== Background ==
=== Genesis of the dispute ===
On 9 July 1291, Venice and Padua signed a treaty of alliance to last for nine years. In 1299, Padua acted as surety for Venice in its peace treaty with Genoa following the War of Curzola. With the expiration of the treaty in 1300, tensions between the two cities immediately rose. The dispute that turned into open warfare began in 1303. It was a dispute over Padua's right to construct salt pans on the swampy peninsula of Calcinara on the Lagoon near the frontier with Chioggia. The Paduan commune had acquired the land at Calcinara from Gualpertino, (Note: Gualpertino abandoned the abbey of Vangadizza to study canon law in Padua, where he was eventually made prior of the monastery of San Polo. According to Giovanni da Nono, he poisoned his predecessor as prior and fathered several illegitimate children. Following a disputed election, Gualpertino was appointed abbot of Santa Giustina by Pope Boniface VIII on 17 February 1300. According to Da Nono, he owed his appointment to a large bribe paid by Vitaliano del Dente and later murdered two monks during his abbacy. Guizzardo da Bologna attributed his appointment to his brother's influence with the pope.) the abbot of Santa Giustina and brother of the poet Albertino Mussato. The salt works may have been started under the monks. Venice, however, claimed a monopoly on supplying salt to the surrounding area. They also sought to stop the Chioggians from working with the Paduans.

=== Preparations for war ===
In an effort to prevent the dispute from turning into a war, Padua sent Giovanni Caligine (Note: Caligine was a knight of humble origins. An ancestor, Alberto Caligine, was a tailor. His brother Giacomo was a notary and judge. Giovanni entered the college of judges in 1273 and served as its gastaldione three times. He was judge of the anziani in 1283. He served as podestà of Vicenza for six months in 1302–1303; of Verona in 1305; of Mantua when it was under the control of Rinaldo dei Bonacolsi; and of Modena in 1314. He had a son named Prosdocimo and a daughter who married into the Capodilista. A Ghibelline, Giovanni was appointed imperial vicar of Arezzo by the Emperor Henry VII in 1312. He became a citizen of Venice by 1314 and in 1320 his sons were declared rebels by Padua.) on a diplomatic mission to Venice. Caligine may also have had a hand in the diplomatic revolution that ended in Padua's alliance with Verona. Negotiations between Padua and Verona took place in March–April, with the personal intervention of Alboino della Scala. The treaty with Verona was signed in Padua on 18 May 1304. Among the signatories were the poet Lovato Lovati and his friend Zambono di Andrea. As a result, Padua's traditional enemy remained neutral during the conflict with Venice. Padua called upon Vicenza, Bassano and Treviso for support. Venice was supported by the D'Este and Da Camino and by the patriarchate of Aquileia.

== War and treaty ==
To defend the salt works, Padua constructed a fortress at Petadibò. By the time Padua had worked out an alliance with Verona, the war was well under way. Simone da Vigodarzere (Note: Simone's father, Onore, held the castle of Vigodarzere in 1278 and fought against Verona that year. Simone was knighted by Azzo VIII d'Este. Between 1296 and 1299, he served successively as podestà of Modena, Florence and Vicenza. He married twice.) was the Paduan commander. The war was an especially bloody one. In the end, the Paduans were routed and the salt pans destroyed. Treviso, under Rizzardo IV da Camino, ultimately interceded to end the war.

Padua was represented by Caligine at the peace conference in Treviso. The peace treaty was signed on 5 October in the church of San Francesco. Among the witnesses was the local Franciscan custos, Paolino Veneto. According to the terms of the treaty, all the fortresses built during the war by either side were to be destroyed. The border between Venice and Padua was also adjusted in the former's favour, to remove the former salt works from the latter's jurisdiction.

== Aftermath ==
Following the peace, the Paduan poets and early humanists Mussato and Lovato exchanged verses on the war. Lovato wrote three poems in this exchange (numbered 27, 28 and 30) and Mussato wrote two (29 and 31), although the order in which they were written is a matter of dispute. Lovato asked Mussato whether he thought the peace could last, given that, through terms that favoured Venice, Padua's "wounded liberty might be the cause of a second conflict." He thought that they should pretend to be satisfied with the terms since "peace, even a simulated one, is peace: often the true follows the feigned." Mussato, however, preferred to denounce the Treaty of Treviso. Otherwise, Paduan sources have say little about the war. One of the best accounts is found the Historia of Ferreto de' Ferreti of Vicenza. The war is mentioned in Riccobaldo of Ferrara's Compilatio chronologica. Marino Sanudo Torsello was also a witness of the war. On the whole, "the chroniclers seem to endorse the Venetian version of the rupture" with Padua.

== Works cited ==
- Cipolla, Carlo, ed. (1908). Le opere di Ferreto de' Ferreti Vicentino. Vol. 1. Forzani E. C. Tipografi del Senato.
- Foligno, Cesare (1910). The Story of Padua. J. M. Dent & Sons.
- Fontana, Emanuele (2014). "Paolino da Venezia, vescovo di Pozzuoli". Dizionario Biografico degli Italiani. Vol. 81. Istituto dell'Enciclopedia Italiana.
- Hankey, A. Teresa, ed. (2000). Ricobaldi Ferrariensis Compilatio Chronologica. Istituto storico italiano per il medio evo.
- Hyde, J. Kenneth (1966). Padua in the Age of Dante: A Social History of an Italian City-State. Manchester University Press.
- McCabe, Aislinn (2022). Albertino Mussato: The Making of a Poet Laureate. A Political and Intellectual Portrait. Routledge.
- Rosada, Bruno [in Italian] (2011). Roberto A. Rosada (ed.). Storia della Letteratura Veneta: Dalle Origini al Quattrocento. Vol. 1. Lulu.
- Sambin, Paolo (1952–1953). "Le relazioni tra Venezia, Padova e Verona all'inizio del secolo XIV". Atti dell'Istituto veneto di scienze, lettere ed arti. 111: 205–215.
- Schor, J. (1871). History of Venice From the Beginning Down to the Present Time. Colombo Coen.
- Simonetti, Remy (2009). Da Padova a Venezia nel medioevo: Terre mobili, confini, conflitti. Viella Libreria Editrice.
- Varanini, Gian Maria (1989). "Della Scala, Alboino". Dizionario Biografico degli Italiani. Vol. 37. Istituto dell'Enciclopedia Italiana.
- Varanini, Gian Maria (1997). "Venezia e l'entroterra (1300 circa – 1420)". Storia di Venezia. Vol. 3. Istituto dell'Enciclopedia Italiana. pp. 159–236.
- Witt, Ronald G. (2003). In the Footsteps of the Ancients: The Origins of Humanism from Lovato to Bruni. Brill Academic.
