= Zambono di Andrea =

Latin poet and historian

Zambono's judgement in the poetic debate between Lovato and Mussato (Leiden manuscript)

Zambono di Andrea or d'Andrea (c. 1235 – 1315/1316) was a Paduan notary, poet and historian who wrote in Latin. His historical writings are lost and are only known from citations. He belonged to the first generation of proto-humanists. On account of a crime committed by one of his sons, he died in exile in Venice.

== Life ==
Zambono was born in Padua around 1235 to a draper named Andrea. His mother's name is unknown. His family belonged to the urban middle class. That he was a member of the Favafoschi family, as later writers have it, is unlikely. His family was dedicated to the notarial profession. Two of his brothers, Antonio and Bartolomeo, became notaries, as did Bartolomeo's son Andrea. Zambono had five sons. Four (Andrea, Filippo, Virgilio and Polidamo) became notaries, while Corradino became a judge.

In 1254, Zambono was a member of the Consiglio Maggiore. By 1258, he was a notary for the city. In 1266, he drew up a pact between Padua and Treviso. Other surviving documents he drew up for the city are from 1264 and 1289. Later, he worked as a notary for the bishop of Padua. With Lovato Lovati, he signed on behalf of Padua a treaty of alliance with Verona against Venice on 18 May 1304. Following the war with Venice, he was part of the commission overseeing the reconstruction of the disputed salt pans.

Late in life Zambono and three of his sons—Andrea, Filippo and Virgilio—were forced into exile for a crime committed by Virgilio while on military assignment. They may have spent time in Vicenza and Treviso before settling in Venice. When the Emperor Henry VII came to Italy in 1311–1313, Albertino Mussato sought advice on whether to support the emperor through a poem addressed to Zambono, whom he calls "the one source and mind of the modern age" (fons et mens una moderni).

Zambono drew up his will in Venice on 15 October 1315. He died there sometime before 7 April 1316.

== Works ==
Zambono wrote a short poem on the families of Padua, their castles and coats of arms. It is known today only from quotations in the De generatione aliquorum civium urbis Padue of Giovanni da Nono. He also contributed two poems to a poetic debate between Lovato Lovati and Albertino Mussato over whether it was better to have children or not. After five poems each, Zambono judged the debate in favour of Lovato and childlessness. After Mussato appealed the decision to Benvenuto Campesani, Zambono wrote a poem addressed to Campesani defending his judgement. The collection of twelve poems is often known collectively as De prole. Imitating the troubadours, all three participants took nicknames (senhals). Zambono went by Bos (ox), while Lovato was Lupus (wolf) and Mussato Asellus (ass). In his judgement, Zambono speaks from experience:

O mihi si talem natura dedisset agellum
Me quoque natorum vano privasset honore
Quam felix quam grata quies, quam laeta fuisset
Vita mihi semper.

If nature had given me a little plot of ground
And also had deprived me of the vain honor of having children,
What blessed, pleasant peace and happy life
I would always have had.

Five other poems by Zambono are found in one manuscript containing De prole. In one of these, dated 4 October 1314 and addressed to Mussato, he expresses joy that Padua had reached a peace with Cangrande della Scala and hoped that he could soon return to Padua.

According to Bernardino Scardeone, writing in the 15th century, Zambono also wrote a prose work "on his country from the foundation of the city" (de patria ab urbe condita). Giovanni Francesco Capodilista, writing in 1434, identifies him as a "poet and historiographer" (poeta et ystoriographus), but distinguishes him from the author of the so-called Pseudo-Favafoschi chronicle, with whom, since 1627, he has often been conflated.

Zambono was "a member of the pre-humanist circle" in Padua. Like Lovato, he belonged to its first generation. Giuseppe Billanovich alleged that his poetry showed the influence of Horace, Martial, Propertius, Tibullus, Catullus, Ovid's Ibis and Statius' Siluae. The evidence for Zambono's knowledge of Propertius, Tibullus, Ibis or Siluae, however, is weak.

== Bibliography ==
- Butrica, James L. (1984). The Manuscript Tradition of Propertius. University of Toronto Press.
- Canzian, Dario (2020) [1960]. "Zambono di Andrea". Dizionario Biografico degli Italiani, Volume 100: Vittorio Emanuele I–Zurlo (in Italian). Rome: Istituto dell'Enciclopedia Italiana. ISBN 978-8-81200032-6.
- Hyde, J. Kenneth (1966). Padua in the Age of Dante: A Social History of an Italian City-State. Manchester University Press.
- McCabe, Aislinn (2022). Albertino Mussato: The Making of a Poet Laureate. A Political and Intellectual Portrait. Routledge.
- Piron, Sylvain (2021). "Utrum sapienti competat prolem habere? An Italian Debate". In Clare Monagle (ed.). The Intellectual Dynamism of the High Middle Ages. Amsterdam University Press. pp. 227–247.
- Witt, Ronald G. (2003). In the Footsteps of the Ancients: The Origins of Humanism from Lovato to Bruni. Brill.
