= Ferreto de' Ferreti =

Italian writer

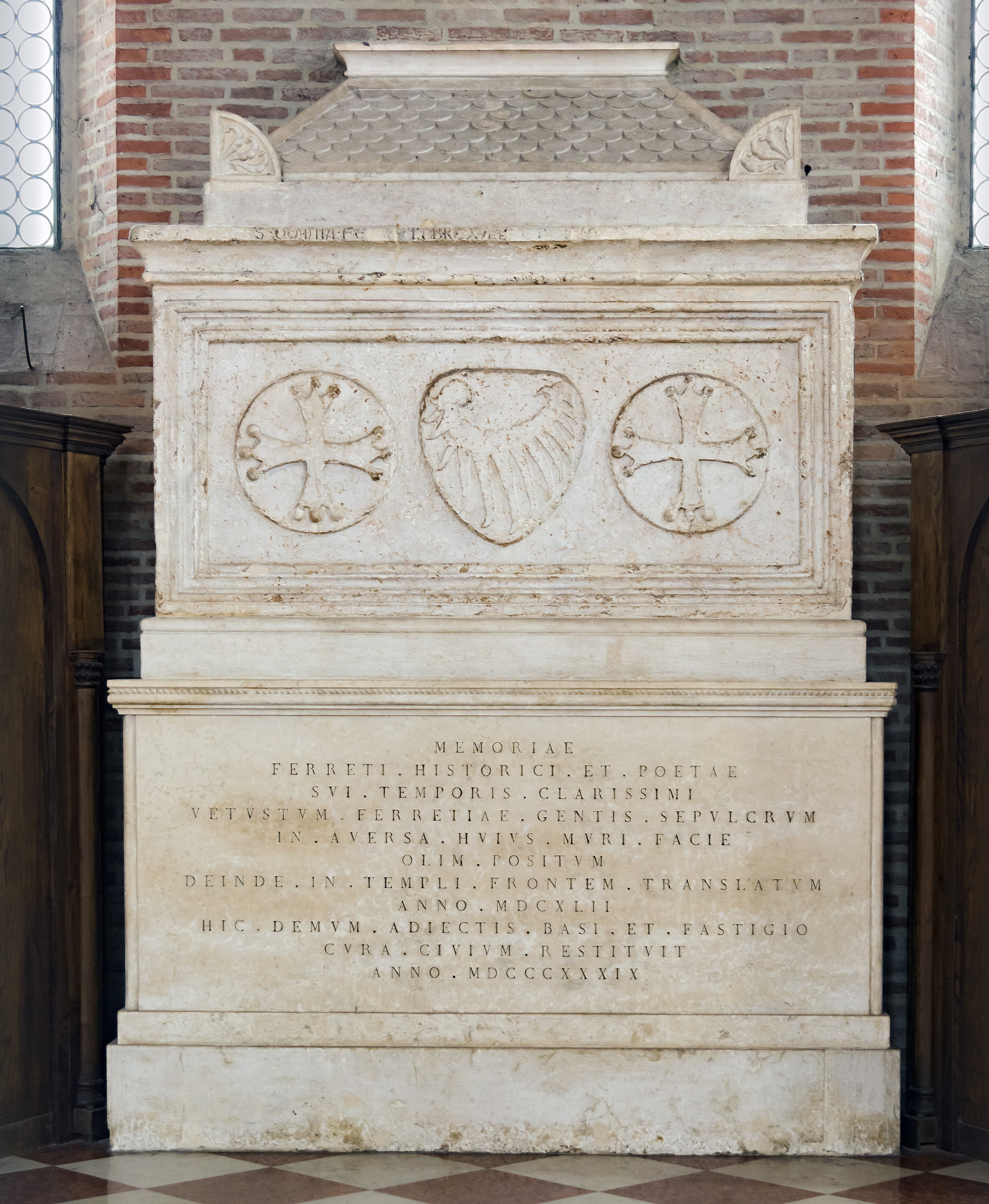
Urn of Ferreto in San Lorenzo, Vicenza

Ferreto de' Ferreti, also spelled dei Ferreti (1294 – April 1337), was an Italian judge, poet and historian from Vicenza. He was one of the early Renaissance humanists and an early reader of Dante Alighieri.

== Life ==
Ferreto was born in Vicenza in 1294. His parents were Giacomo and Costanza. His family may have been of Paduan origin, since his grandfather, Ferreto Brexani, is attested as a notary at Vicenza only from 1266, when the latter submitted to the domination of the former. By 1283, Giacomo was a notary and his brother Donato was a judge.

Ferreto's father died in 1302 and, owing to his elder brother Francesco's mental disability, he became the nominal head of the family. By 1317, Ferreto had married Anna, daughter of the judge Alberto de Scaletis, who brought him a dowry of 500 pounds. He must have trained as a notary in Vicenza. He also studied classical Latin, especially poetry. Benvenuto Campesani was one of his teachers. He probably met the poet Albertino Mussato of Padua, who was a prisoner in Vicenza in 1314. He joined the College of Notaries in 1316 and was elected its gastaldo (head) on 17 April 1320. His younger brother Citaino also became a notary.

Ferreto continued to be listed among the members of the college until 1336. He served a second term as gastaldo in 1331 and a third in 1336. He was on other occasions an elector, examiner and councilor of the college. Some original documents of his from 1316 survive. His professional life was, on the whole, uneventful. He died in 1337 between 4 April, when he drew up his will, and 10 April, when his name was removed from the matricula of the college. He requested burial in the Dominican church of Santa Corona and also left money for the Franciscan church of San Lorenzo.

== Works ==
Ferreto wrote in Latin. His best known work is his Historia rerum in Italia gestarum ('history of Italian deeds'), a history of northern Italy—both Venetian and Imperial—from 1250 to 1318. The central episode of the Historia is the Italian expedition of Henry VII of Germany (begun 1310), his coronation as Holy Roman Emperor (1312) and his premature death (1314). The conflict between the Staufers and the Angevins following the death of the Emperor Frederick II (1250) provides the background. Ample space is also devoted to the rule of the Habsburgs from 1291 to 1308.

Ferreto was an eyewitness to much of the later history in his Historia. He also makes use of the contemporary Historia Augusta of Mussato, although he has a diametrically opposed attitude to Cangrande I della Scala for his liberation of Vicenza from Paduan control, which Mussato laments and he praises. He shares Mussato's view that history is a guide to action in the present. Although he endeavours to be objective, his partisanship of the Empire shows through. Ferreto probably began work on the Historia around 1330 and was still working on it at his death. It is conserved in a single manuscript, now in Vicenza, Biblioteca Civica Bertoliana, MS 314 (formerly shelfmarked G.7.9.17 and Gonz.21.10.12).

Ferreto also wrote poetry. His priapic verses survive only in fragments. He wrote a poem in 110 lines on the death of Dante Alighieri in 1321, although it appears unfinished. He may have met Dante at the court of Cangrande. He quotes from him and is one of the first who can be shown to have studied Dante's works. He also wrote six poems on the death of the Vicentine poet Campesani in 1323. His major work in verse, however, is Carmen de Scaligerorum origine poema, a poem on the origins of the Scaligeri dedicated to Cangrande I. It was written between Cangrande's takeover of Padua in September 1328 and his death in July 1329. The original poem was in four books, but the surviving version has a fifth book in metrical prose that is not by Ferreto.

All of Ferreto's works have been published by Carlo Cipolla. Ferreto was an early humanist. His achievements in that regard exceed those of his teacher, Campesani. He shares "with Mussato the honour of inaugurating a novel historical technique, which marks the beginning of humanist historiography." In his works, "the rôle of the individual in the shaping of events" is more pronounced than in other medieval works.

== Bibliography ==
=== Editions ===
- Cipolla, Carlo, ed. (1908). Le opere di Ferreto de' Ferreti Vicentino. Fonti per la storia d'Italia, 42. Vol. 1. Forzani E. C. Tipografi del Senato.
- Cipolla, Carlo, ed. (1914). Le opere di Ferreto de' Ferreti Vicentino. Fonti per la storia d'Italia, 43. Vol. 2. Forzani E. C. Tipografi del Senato.
- Cipolla, Carlo, ed. (1920). Le opere di Ferreto de' Ferreti Vicentino. Fonti per la storia d'Italia, 44. Vol. 3. Forzani E. C. Tipografi del Senato.

=== Secondary literature ===
- Bortolami, Sante (1997). "Ferreti, Ferreto de'". Dizionario Biografico degli Italiani (in Italian). Vol. 47: Ferrero–Filonardi. Rome: Institute of the Italian Encyclopaedia. pp. 57–60. ISBN 978-88-12-00032-6.
- Kohl, Benjamin G. (2010). "Ferreti, Ferretto de'". In Graeme Dunphy (ed.). Encyclopedia of the Medieval Chronicle. Vol. 1: A–I. Leiden: Brill. p. 617.
- Torre, Augusto (1970). "Ferreti, Ferreto de'". Enciclopedia Dantesca. Vol. 2. Rome: Istituto dell'Enciclopedia Italiana. p. 844.
- Weiss, Roberto (1947). The Dawn of Humanism in Italy: An Inaugural Lecture. London.
- Witt, Ronald G. (2003). In the Footsteps of the Ancients: The Origins of Humanism from Lovato to Bruni. Brill Academic.
