= Guglielmo Cortusi =

Guglielmo Cortusi (fl. 1305–1361) was a Paduan judge, diplomat and chronicler whose Chronica de novitatibus Padue et Lombardie is the principal primary source for Paduan history in the early years of Carraresi rule.

== Life ==
Guglielmo belonged to the Cortusi family. He was born in Padua probably around 1285, since he first witnesses a document on 27 February 1305. His father was Bonzanello Cortusi. In December 1315, Guglielmo entered the judicial college in Padua. After graduating, he became a judge, a position he held until 1356. Between 1321 and 1353, he was the gastaldione of the college six times.

Besides acting as a judge, Guglielmo acted on occasion as a diplomat. In 1327, he was one of the Paduan representatives sent to deal with the representatives of the Emperor Louis IV in Verona. Their efforts to preserve Padua's autonomy failed and the city was forced to submit to Cangrande della Scala. In March 1336, he was sent to Verona to complain about high taxes and various other abuses of the Veronese podestà. In June, he was one of four judges temporarily placed in charge of the city while awaiting a new podestà. After 1337, when the Carraresi established their signoria over the city, Guglielmo did not undertake any diplomacy.

Guglielmo married Enide, daughter of the judge Alberto Bergoleti da Castrobrenta. She was still alive when he drew up his will on 2 January 1357 in his house in the San Bartolomeo quarter. He left 300 lire as a dowry for each of his three daughters. His son Giovanni having already died, his heirs were Giovanni's three sons: Ludovico, Pietro and Bonzanello. Guglielmo is last recorded alive in 1361.

== Chronica de novitatibus Padue et Lombardie ==
Guglielmo wrote a Latin chronicle of Padua, Chronica de novitatibus Padue et Lombardie (Chronicle of the Novelties of Padua and Lombardy), covering the years 1237–1358. For the period 1237–1310 he relied on existing chronicles, but from 1311 his Chronica is an independent source. It is the only Paduan source on the transition from the commune to the lordship (signoria). The journey to Rome of Henry VII of Germany in 1310 probably provided the impetus for Guglielmo to begin writing. He continued to expand his work down to 1358. He is often an eyewitness.

The Chronica is written in a conservative style, almost in the form of annals, and lack the standard rhetorical flourishes. The only work it quotes directly is the Bible. It bears no similarity to the proto-humanistic works of Albertino Mussato, influenced by classical historians like Livy. Cortusi is less interested in motivations than Mussato, but his perspective after 1318 is less warped by hatred for the Carraresi lords of Padua.

The first event recorded is Ezzelino da Romano's conquest of Padua in 1237. The first seven books of the Chronica are derived from the chronicle of Rolandino of Padua. Guglielmo shares the latter's negative attitude towards Ezzelino and positive attitude towards republican government and the Venetian constitution. The period after the ouster of Ezzelino and the re-establishment of the republican constitution (1256) is portrayed not unreasonably as a golden age of peace and prosperity for Padua. The subsequent rule of the Scaligeri over Padua is described in terms reminiscent of Ezzelino's rule. Marsilio da Carrara, who liberated the city during the Scaliger War in 1337, is portrayed a patriot and hero. Guglielmo thus presents a generally pro-Carrara account in contrast to the strongly anti-Carrara account of Mussato.

Until the end, Guglielmo's focus is on the commune. Later chronicles of Padua are focused on the ruling family. The Chronica was used as a source by such later histories, notably the Gesta magnifica domus Carrariensis.

Some modern editors attributed the Chronica to Guglielmo and his great-grandson Albrighetto, but Beniamino Pagnin demonstrated that this was an error.

=== Editions ===
- Pagnin, Beniamino, ed. (1941). Guillelmi de Cortusiis chronica de novitatibus Padue et Lombardie. Rerum italicarum scriptores, XII, 5. Bologna. pp. 806–807.

== Sources ==
- Hyde, J. Kenneth (1966). Padua in the Age of Dante: A Social History of an Italian City-State. Manchester University Press.
- Hyde, J. Kenneth (1983). "Cortusi, Guglielmo". Dizionario Biografico degli Italiani (in Italian). Vol. 29: Cordier–Corvo. Rome: Institute of the Italian Encyclopaedia. ISBN 978-88-12-00032-6.
- Lee, Alexander (2018). Humanism and Empire: The Imperial Ideal in Fourteenth-Century Italy. Oxford University Press.
- Kohl, Benjamin G. (1998). Padua Under the Carrara, 1318–1405. Johns Hopkins University Press.
- Kohl, Benjamin G. (2007). "Chronicles into Legends and Lives: Two Humanist Accounts of the Carrara Dynasty in Padua". In Sharon Dale; Alison Williams Lewin; Duane J. Osheim (eds.). Chronicling History: Chroniclers and Historians in Medieval and Renaissance Italy. Pennsylvania State University Press. pp. 223–248.
