= Geremia da Montagnone =

Italian judge (died 1320/21)

Geremia da Montagnone or Hieremias Paduanus, Hieremìas de Montagliene (died 1320 or 1321) was a judge and author active in Padua at the beginning of the 14th century. Little is known about his life and career, but he was apparently involved with the "proto-humanist" literary circle of Lovato Lovati at Padua. His writings include a florilegium entitled “Compendium moralium notabilium” which was published at Venice in 1505 under the title “Epytoma sapientie”.
