= Cortusi family =

The Cortusi family was prominent in Padua in the 13th through 15th centuries. In contemporary documents, their surname may also appear as da Cortusiis, da Curtosiis, de Curtexis or de Cortisiis.

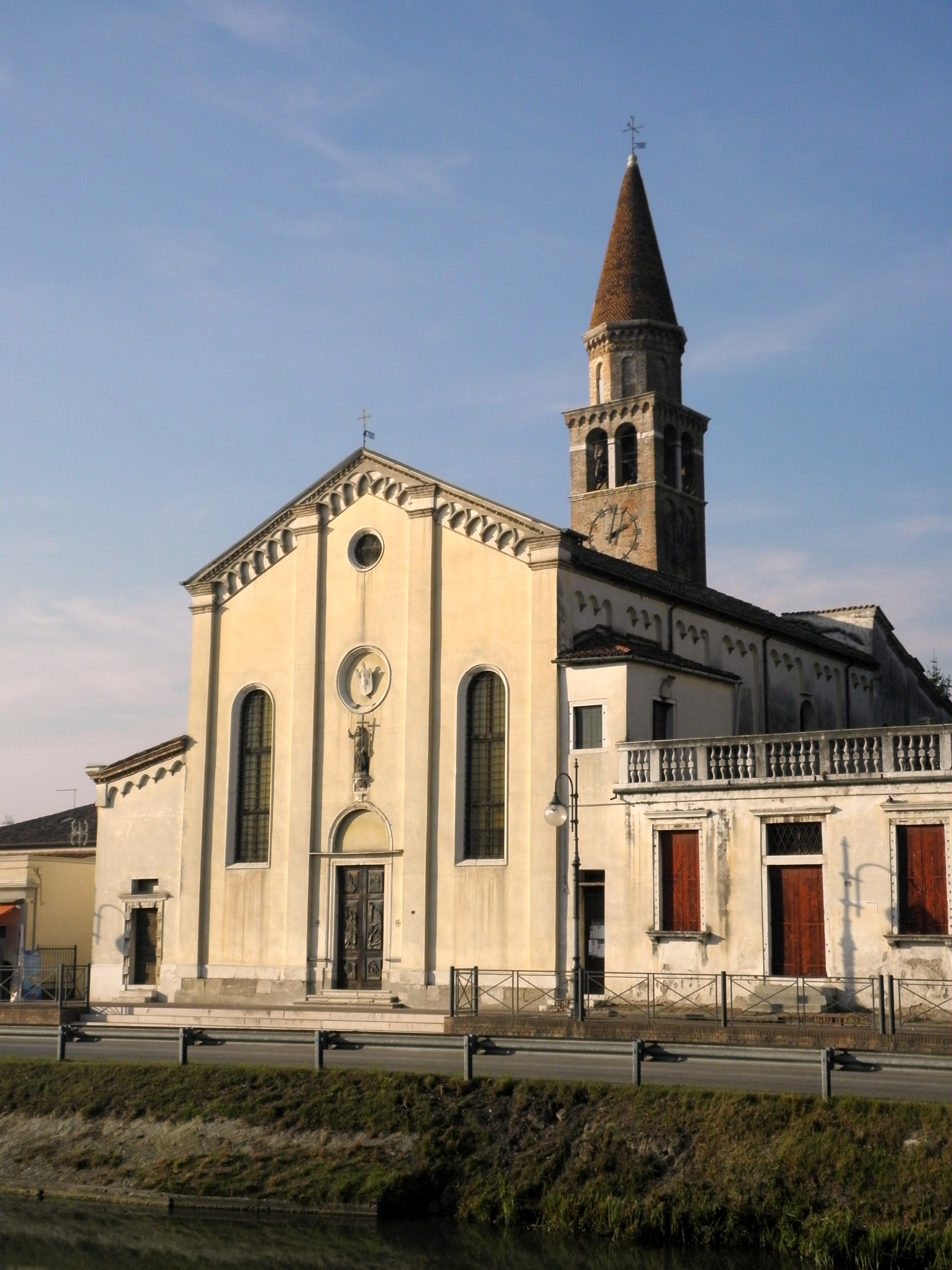
Church of Oriago, led by Ruggiero Cortusi in 1313

Of humble origin, the Cortusi seem to have emigrated from Germany to Italy in the 11th century. Late sources place their arrival in Italy in 1014, but the first document to mention them is the Descriptio civium per quatuor quarteria patavinorum (Description of the citizens of the four quarters of the Paduans) of 1275. Some modern historians have incorrectly ascribed nobility to the family, but in fact it was just well-established and wealthy by the later 13th century. The Cortusi were based in the district of Ponte Altinate and the village of Ognisanti. Along the river Brenta to the east of the city, they held lands and rights to tithes in fief from the bishopric of Treviso. Writing around 1317 in his Liber de generatione aliquorum civium urbis Padue, Giovanni da Nono describes the family as having an interest in law and its head, Matteo, as a knight, although there is no other evidence of that he held this status.

Matteo Cortusi was the podestà of Bassano in 1278, and the councilor in charge of the same city when it fell under Paduan rule in 1281. In 1292, he was the Paduan councilor in charge of fortifying Castrobaldo sull'Adige. In 1303 and again in 1306, he served the commune as ambassador to the Republic of Venice. According to his will, drawn up on 24 June 1308, he had four children. Ruggiero entered the church, becoming prior of Oriago by 1313. Aldrighetto (whose name is also given as Albrighetto or Albrigetto) was knighted by Guecellone da Camino, became podestà of Feltre in 1361 and of Belluno in 1322. Bonzanello does not seem to have held public office and was dead by March 1313, but his son, Guglielmo, became a prominent jurist and chronicler after 1315. Guglielmo's son, Giovanni, predeceased him, leaving three sons of his own: Ludovico, Pietro and Bonzanello. Ludovico also became a jurist. He had a son named Giovanni.

Other Cortusi include Marco, who purchased two houses in October 1288; Ivano, whose son Castellano witnessed an act pertaining to the monastery of San Giovanni di Verdara in 1334 and whose other son, Giovanni, entered the judicial school in 1297; Francesco, son of Giovanni Zagnacco, who was dead by June 1344; Lodovico, doctor of law and judge, attested in 1397 and 1412; Francesco, son of the late Giacomo, attested in 1390; and Albrigetto, born 1388, great-grandson of Guglielmo, once believed to have written a continuation of his chronicle.

== Sources ==
- Ghisalberti, Alberto Maria (1983). "Cortusi, Ludovico". Dizionario Biografico degli Italiani, Volume 29: Cordier–Corvo (in Italian). Rome: Istituto dell'Enciclopedia Italiana. ISBN 978-8-81200032-6.
- Hyde, J. Kenneth (1983). "Cortusi, Guglielmo". Dizionario Biografico degli Italiani, Volume 29: Cordier–Corvo (in Italian). Rome: Istituto dell'Enciclopedia Italiana. ISBN 978-8-81200032-6.
- Pagnin, Beniamino, ed. (1941). Guillelmi de Cortusiis chronica de novitatibus Padue et Lombardie. Rerum italicarum scriptores, XII, 5. Bologna.
