= Lovato Lovati =

Lovato Lovati (1241–1309) was an Italian scholar, poet, notary, judge and humanist from the High Middle Ages and early Italian Renaissance. Arguable among historians, Lovati is considered the "father of Humanism." His literary Padua circle included Rolando de Piazzola, Geremia da Montagnone, and Albertino Mussato. Lovati's scholarship marked characteristics which would later define the development of humanism: an appetite for classical texts; a philological concern to correct them, and ascertain their meaning; and a desire to imitate them. Scholars such as Petrarch commented on his works favorably. Lovati's achievements which survive today are his Latin verse epistles, and his short commentary of Seneca's tragedies.

== Early life, education, and career ==
The exact birthdate of Lovato Lovati is not known; William Sisler suggests 1241 whereas Ronald Witt asserts that it is 1240. However it is certain that he was born in Padua. Lovato's father, Rolando Lovati, was a notary along with Lovato's brother, Alberto Lovati. A young Lovato in the 1250s and 1260s benefitted greatly from a revival of formal study of ancient texts, this revival took place in the studio of Padua, which was the local university. During these years it is possible that Lovato was taught by Ronaldino of Padua, a writer at the time. Lovato was tasked with educating his nephew, Rolando da Piazzola, and he later dedicated a poem to him. This nephew was the son of his sister who married Guido da Piazzola.

Despite being among the progenitors of the Italian humanist movement, Lovato Lovati's primary occupation was his work as a notary and judge. Although Lovato was enamoured by his poetic, scholarly, and literary interests; the majority of Lovato's time was consumed by his occupation. At the age of 16 or 17 Lovato began to work as a notary making copies from his father's register, a signature on a document dated in 1257 suggests that Lovato's formal education had ended by this point. It seems that Lovato's father, Rolando, intended for Lovato to have the same career as him. On May 6, 1267, Lovato was accepted into Padua's College of Judges at the age of 26 or 27. At least six years of formal legal study was required for admission into the college, implying that by this point in time Lovato had completed this. Within the first year of being admitted into the college of judges Lovato composed two poems: one to Compagnino (a Paduan lawyer and friend of Lovato), and another poem written in dactylic hexameter. One year later in 1268, Lovato married Jacopina de Vicenzo da Solesina with whom he had a son named Ronaldo. By 1271 Lovato was a judge in the palace of the Commune, and in 1273 he became gastaldo of the College of Judges. Although the positions of notary and judge were not socially esteemed positions, Lovato used his profession to bolster his fortune and influence in Padua.

The following is a brief list of Lovato Lovati's career accomplishments outside his poetic work:

- In 1275 Lovato was involved in the acquisition of land for a Paduan hospital named "Domus Dei"
- In 1282 Lovato became podesta of Bassano
- In 1283 an archeological discovery occurred, and the remains from a large corpse were found. Lovato identified them as the remains as Antenor, who was the mythical trojan founder of Padua. Lovato was commissioned to create an inscription for a sarcophagus made for the remains.
- In 1284 Lovato witnessed at a resolution given by Lodovico Capodivaca
- In 1286 Lovato assisted in the hall of the Maggiore Consiglio
- In 1287 he assisted in the Bishop's residence
- In 1288 Lovato assisted in the church of St. Martin
- In 1290 he assisted in the Office of the Inquisition
- In 1291 Lovato became a knight and podesta of Vicenza
- In 1295 he assisted in the convent of St. Anthony

The security of Padua seems to have been an important concern to Lovato during his lifetime, he expressed anxiety in his poetry over the threat of Venice and Charles of Anjou. For the majority of Lovato's life Padua pursued an aggressive policy or territorial expansion: by 1267 Vicenza and Bassano were both brought under Paduan territory. In 1304 Lovato was selected to appear as a witness for the Paduan alliance with Verona. Although he was deceased by this time, in the early 14th century Padua absorbed the county of Rovigo. Lovato's opinions on this political instability was often expressed in his poetry, in 1302 the Paduan poet Mussato called on Lovato in a poem to predict the consequences of Padua's warfare with Charles of Anjou and several Tuscan cities. Lovato responded by stating his fears that the conflict would lead to increased factionalism within Padua and reasoned that liberty would only thrive in a time of peace. In Lovato's final years he seems to be cognisant of the weakness of the Paduan commune, possibly taking Padua's defeat by the Venetian salt monopoly in 1304 as a bad omen. In October 1304 following the Treaty of Treviso, a treaty that ended the Salt War with Venice, a poem Lovato wrote to Mussato displays his anxiety over the treaty. Lovato was concerned that the peace might not be genuine and that animosity between the two cities would continue. Although Lovato felt that the treaty gave an unequal advantage to Venice, Lovato urged for peace in his poems and thought the loss of salt marshes was minor compared to peace. In one of his poems at the time, Lovato stated: "Peace, even a simulated one, is peace: often the true follows the feigned." Along with Mussato, Lovato was part of a circle of Paduan literati that met to discuss and create poetic works. Albertino Mussato is often credited as being the brightest member of this circle. Lovato often enjoyed conversations with another member of this circle, Bellino Bissoli; both authors had drastically different approaches to poetry.

Lovato died on March 7, 1309. Prior to his death Lovato prepared epitaphs to embellish his resting place, leaving two inscriptions on his tomb. According to Giovanni del Virgilio, on Lovato's deathbed he gave his reed pipes to Albertino Mussato and said: "Since you are deemed gifted by the muses, by these will you be muse-inspired. Ivy will circle your temples." This symbolic gesture can be seen as way of Lovato recognizing Mussato as his poetic heir.

== Philosophical work ==
=== On the imitation of ancient philosophy ===
It was around 1290 when Lovato Lovati affirmed his intention to follow in the footsteps of the ancient poets—a principle that conditioned his whole approach to antiquity. In a letter written to his friend, Bellino Bissolo, Lovati declared, "Your actions, in order to be praiseworthy, should be distant from the two extremes by an equal distance…However, if you must "Err" on one side, it should be on the side of the daring." Although ridiculed for his rigid maintenance of ancient poetic standards, Lovati was motivated to apply himself into ancient texts. Lovato compared his willingness to absorb ancient principles to several Greek ancients such as Capeneus and Achilles. In response towards critiques he wrote, "I won't change my mind. I stand fast, as in my habit, and I won't correct the vice of my long disease."

=== On ancient literature ===
While assessing ancient literature, Lovato characterized three features which mark the development of humanism: an appetite for classical texts; a philological concern to correct them and ascertain their meaning, and a desire to imitate them. Noted by Petrarch, it was Lovato's study of law which introduced him to the ancient literature. However while drawing on ancient Roman sources for their own work, Lovato and his disciple Albertino Mussato, showed little interest in investigating the nature of the society, that produced them. Lovato's poetry exposed his confused notion of the ancient past, where Greek and Roman history and mythology mingle without distinction as their basis in reality. Yet, Lovati's success demonstrated his profound intensive study of ancient law, vocabulary and phraseology. His stylistic accomplishments, and ability to imitate ancient Latin, suggest that he was at least making a beginning of establishing an emotional and intellectual contact with a segment of the ancient experience. A keen admirer of the Roman dramatist Seneca, Lovato demonstrated his clear understanding of metrical structure of ancient Latin poetry, later producing the earliest Renaissance treatise on metrics. He wrote a short account of Senecan meters, illustrating Latin poet's preference for two verse patterns, the pentameter and the hexameter. In his letters, Lovato strives to match classical vocabulary, meter and tone, revealing a strong emphasis of grammatical components towards the literary movement. Evidently, Lovato only reformed his poetry, leaving his prose untouched. Unlike his poetry, Lovato's Dictamina borrowed few phrases from ancient authors, not erecting the effect of ancient prose. This bifurcation of Lovato's work is characteristic of the literary movement he pioneered for the first forty years.

=== On language ===
In the 1180s, French culture slowly emerged in the Italian peninsula, propelling an indigenous literary and intellectual development. The French cultural movement encouraged poets to reflect on the historiography of grammar within poetry. As a result, pressure increased to intensify the study of ancient French and Provençal texts. This pressure, combined with his spirit of competition, inspired Lovato to not only write, but also defend ancient Latin poetry against those who preferred modern vernacular verse. He argued against using the vernacular language in poetry and song. For instance he wrote, "At random, he mutilated songs in French, gaping in barbarous fashion, rolling them out as he pleased, no part of them in their proper order, songs relying on no effort." Lovato described the French as simply comprehensible to popular audience, easy, and loose, thus revealing his disdain for the language.

=== On mythology and self-praise ===
Lovato was involved in a large discovery of the ceremonious reburial and supposed body remains of the mythical founder of Padua, the Trojan Antenor. The reception of his discovery illustrated the depth of admiration felt by the multitude for an ancient society that was a part of their cultural mythology. In contrast to his interest in mythology, Lovato was immensely critical over the influence of self-praise on his works. In order to convey his clarity and knowledge, Lovato recognized self-praise would only inhibit and clutter his execution of poetry and prose.

== Writing style, work and achievements ==
Lovato dei Lovati was highly regarded by Petrarch and others prominent humanists as a forerunner in the classicising movement. The literary circle led by Lovato, based in the mid thirteenth century Paduan commune was one of the first scholarly groups of people in Europe to embrace the humanistic philosophical outlook and to develop a revived interest in ancient text. Ronald Witt argues that denying Lovato and his followers of the Humanist title by subordinating them to a lesser position as Petrarch in the humanist movement would not do them the justice they deserve. Lovato's first poems began to appear in the 1250s displaying evidence of his urge to reconnect with the ancient past thus marking the start of the classicising movement.

Lovato's decision to compose poetry in Latin instead of the vernaculars, as it was the trend of the time was not coincidental. During the late twelfth century, French and Provençal models exerted large influence on the vernacular poetry of northern Italy. The popularity of the vernacular poetry invoked a sense of competition in Lovato, which pushed him to write in Latin. This sense of competition with the vernacular was not directed towards the native Paduan dialect but rather to French. During mid thirteenth century, there was a development of a new interest in composing Latin poetry among northern and central Italian literary scholars such Bellino Bissolo and Bonvesin de la Riva but Lovato was the first among these poets to write in perfectly classicising Latin and included in his work themes that were unconventional to the Latin Italian poetic tradition.

=== Reintroduction of ancient authors and rare work ===
Despite Lovato's condescending feelings towards the vernacular referring to them as "barbarous" in one of his letters to Bellino Bissolo, he nonetheless incorporated many of the French and Provençal influences in his poems. In the first of the two letters of his surviving works written to his friend Campagnino discussing about his illness in poems, allusions to the French romantic poem Tristan and Isolde was evident. The poem consists of 227 elegiac lines incorporating various ancient sources in his writing. In addition, Lovato in his poem reintroduced some of the unheard ancient authors to his audiences such as Tibullus, Propertius, Martial, Catullus, and Lucretius whom regular contemporary medieval Europeans may have never heard of for the past several centuries. Rare works from authors whom were somewhat more familiar to the educated class in medieval Europe were also brought once again to people's awareness. These included Horace's Carmina and Statius' Silvae. Ovid's Metamorphoses, which was well known to his contemporary audiences, also influenced the poem.

=== Writing style ===
In composing this poem Lovato at times experienced difficulties mastering the language in describing his thoughts, which explains why certain passages sounded more like prose. The biblical references used were said to have tainted the classicising character of the poem. The second poem to Campagnino discussing about his plan to marry was in dactylic hexameter. The vocabulary Lovato employed in his poems at this time was generally classical in character, as well as displaying accurate use of metrics coherent with ancient models. Despite Lovato's overall humanistic approach in composing poetry, many evidences suggest that the Paduan notary was not completely broken away from medieval characteristics. Lovato's fondness with the Leonine verse, a form of rhythmic structure in Latin poetry popular in the Middle Ages, the inclusion of many Christian references in his own epitaph as well as his poems, the allusion to Tristan and Isolde all exemplify his imperfect secession with the medieval tradition.

=== Contribution ===
Lovato created many manuscripts during his lifetime, many of which were lost. A survived manuscript which is now preserved in the British Library which Lovato copied personally, included his two letters to Campagnino as well as his two other letters, one letter written to him from his friend Ugo Mezzabati, and works of Justin, Pompeius Trogus, and Bede. Lovato's lost manuscript of Livy, which included many rare works played significant role in helping to revive Livy's work in the centuries to come. Lovato's manuscript of Seneca's Tragedies was a centrepiece among his life's accomplishments, which served a key role in the movement for the revival of Seneca's work.

Lovato attached an essay at the end of the manuscript Seneca's Tragedies discussing the metrical schemes in Seneca's plays. Other than rare works such as Horace's Carmina and Statius's Silvae being brought back into the awareness of Western Europeans for the first time in three to four centuries, Lovato also made known Ovid's Ibis and Martial's Epigramus to his medieval audiences.

=== French/Provençal elements ===
Despite his insistence on adhering to classical literary model and the orthodoxy of the Latin language, Lovato's work was not impermeable to the popular French influences, which were appreciated and adopted by many of his contemporary Italian poets. Allusions to the French romance Tristan and Isolde and several other examples included in the first letter to Compagnino together suggest that Lovato's work demonstrates evidence of French langue d'oc and langue d'oil elements. Moreover, Lovato assumed the Provençal custom to have sobriquets. This later poems' mimic that of the vernacular sonnet, except that they were written in Latin instead of French. Inspired by the Provençal tenzone, a form of poetry, which has its origin in France, Lovato adopted the practice of using poetry as a medium of debate. The aforementioned examples all serve as evidences of the influence exerted on him by the French tradition.

=== Later poems: on politics and morality ===
Lovato's later poems were easily distinguishable from his earlier poems because of their differences not just in style but also in content and theme. Lovato's later poems became more concentrated on the subjects such as politics and morality. Stylistically Lovato's later poems were more medieval in character. Despite the maintenance of the use classical vocabulary in his writing, the overemphasis of assonance, the use of per tempora, and the quasi-paratactic structure were all examples of his falling way from the classical model. The later poems also "lack intensity" and were deficient of metaphorical language. The references he included in the poems were sometimes incoherent with the central theme of what he wanted to say. Lovato's concessions to Medievalism in his later poems was not believed to be a transformation in aesthetic ideals but simply a loss of inspiration.

With regards to poems on morality, Lovato had a poetic debate with Mussato on the question of whether or not it is better to have children. They debated the practical impacts on individuals of having children with Lovato arguing that children were "source of father's grief, not happiness". In the end Lovato was declared winner by Zambono di Andrea. In his correspondence with Mussato c. 1302, Lovato offered his insight on the impact of the war between Charles II of Anjou with the Tuscan cities on Padua at Mussato's request. In his work written on factionalism, De conditionibus urbis Padue et peste Guelfi et Gibolengi nominis, Lovato predicted that the military tension in central Italy might initiate factionalism in Padua. During the time when Treaty of Treviso, which ended the war over salt trade with Venice, was signed, Lovato exchanged views with Mussato on whether this peace would last. He was worried that Paduans would not accept the treaty terms willingly due to the freedom that was stripped away from them.

=== Prose/Ars Dictaminis ===
Lovato's surviving prose in the British Library manuscript evidenced that he adhered strictly to medieval ars dictaminis, following obediently the standard medieval model for writing prose which consists of salutatio, followed by exordium, narratio, petitio, and conclusio. Stylistically, Lovato's prose has a solemn tone of voice and the language was medieval in character with over emphasis on colores. Lovato displayed a preference for stylus altus (high style) form of letter writing, which was the most prestigious and difficult of them all.

== Influence on other Renaissance scholars ==
We cannot assume that the influence of Lovato on other poets and scholars of the Renaissance is direct, but his general belief in the magnificence of Latin verse and his unique compositions made it the preferred form of expression in the period. According to Witt,"The first to capture with consistency the flavor of the classical authors and to state explicitly that imitation of the ancients was his goal, Lovato may rightfully be considered the founder of Italian humanism." Thereby making his influence on Renaissance humanism potent.

Lovato introduced to the poets of the 14th century, through his work and influence, the importance of being precise and correct. By making the writings of the ancient world his guiding spirit, he was able to bring about a conscious intellectual change in the manner in which poets perceived the environment around them. Further, through an analysis of the grammatical component and the syntax of the works of early ages, he was able to bring about "'a reorganization of consciousness,' habits of expressing ideas with precision and nuances that both unlocked the mentality of the classical authors and allowed the humanists themselves to approach their own work with that perspective."

Playing the role as a notary, he advanced the cause of classical learning and the use of classical texts through his use of these texts and employ classical imagery in his poetry. In his writings, from the first instances of his poetical composition, as seen in the letters of 1267/68, they would be the first "written by an Italian since late antiquity to employ classical diction for the expression of private thoughts and feelings" through a conscious discarding of the vernacular taste that had been influenced by the French works.

Among those specifically influenced and dedicated to Lovato's style of writing and expression was Albertino Mussato, one of his disciples. Mussato, in the later years of his life, in spite of his deep interactions with Lovato gave credit to Buonincontro da Mantova as his teacher, but the latter, like other intellectuals from Padua, such as Zambono di Andrea and Ugo Mezzabati were deeply influenced by Lovato, thereby indicating that Mussato derived much from Lovato's stylistic schemes.

Lovato Lovati's influence upon the succeeding generation of poets of the humanist tradition can also be seen in his great familiarity with the writings of the ancients who were unknown to writers and poets that came even 3 to 4 centuries before them, thereby reiterating the idea that classical Latin texts had been generally given up in favour of the French. Through his translations and writings Lovato introduced to the poets of 13th and 14th century Italy the works of "Tibulus Catullus, and Propertius... Lucretius and Martial." Lovato's poetry was informed by the desire to emulate his predecessors especially from ancient Rome and he did so by "imitating ancient eloquence in the ancients own language." and this model would inspire later generations who would discard the Provençal form in favour of their own classical examples.

Petrarch is considered one of the greatest humanists and often titled the "father of humanism" in the Italian Renaissance. He owed much of his humanistic tendencies to the study of the classical texts of ancient Rome, especially the writings of Seneca. Seneca's writings, especially his moral writings, "exercised tremendous influence on early humanists concerned with ethical problems." And it was Lovato's belief in the promise of a better time as expounded by Seneca, which coloured his poetry and ultimately helped formulate the thinking of Petrarch towards such matters. Also, in his humanistic philosophy and its explication and embrace of the secular and civic life, Petrarch showed himself to be more of a "grammarian than that of a rhetorician" much like Lovato.

One of the most important ideas of the humanistic philosophy of the specific period was a desire to lead the good life, understood in the sense of being happy and contribute to the world around oneself. The idea of deeply engaging with matters of faith was not an important part of the philosophy of the humanistic tradition, unlike that of the many periods which came before it. In his analysis of his beliefs, Lovato states "I want nothing except to enjoy happy times, and when sweet things are lacking, to die sweetly." This same tendency is seen in the writings of poets like Coluccio Salutati who would place great emphasis on such qualities as friendship, human happiness and the role of fate and destiny in human endeavors.

The influence of Lovato Lovati on subsequent Italian humanism which would mark the beginning of the Renaissance is undeniable. In general, he should be considered to be the one who introduced 13th century Padua to the glories of ancient Rome through the utilisation of ancient Latin vocabulary and texts and its dissemination to other regions of learning in 14th century Italy. The compositional technique, stress upon creating works of poetry rather than use the prosaic style and bringing about secularity in the subject matter of such compositions, have given a new direction to writers of this period.

== See also ==
- Renaissance
- Humanism
- Italian city-states
- Vernacular
- Rhetoric
- Classical antiquity
- Rome
