= Matricula =

Matricula, a Latin word meaning a register, has several meanings in Christian antiquity. The word is applied first to the catalogue or roll of the clergy of a particular church; thus clerici immatriculati denoted the clergy entitled to maintenance from the resources of the church to which they were attached. Allusions to matricula in this sense are found in the second and third canons of the Council of Agde and in canon 13 of the Fourth Council of Orléans (both of the sixth century).

As a registry, a matricula can also be used to refer to a document students sign at the beginning of their collegiate careers as part of a matriculation or convocation ceremony that some colleges and universities perform for incoming students to formally mark the beginning of their studies.

A second use of the term was to refer to the ecclesiastical list of poor pensioners who were assisted from the church revenues; hence the names matricularii, matriculariae, by which persons thus assisted, together with those who performed menial services about the church, were known.

The house in which such pensioners were lodged was also known as matricula, which thus becomes synonymous with xenodochium.
