= Benvenuto Campesani =

Italian poet and notary

Benvenuto Campesani (c. 1250 – 1323) was a Vicentine poet and notary.

He composed in particular a short poem in elegiac couplets "on the resurrection of Catullus, Veronese poet"; that is, on some event related to a manuscript of Catullus. The poem is apparently written as a sort of a riddle, and its precise meaning is unclear. It tells of some compatriot of Catullus, probably named Franciscus (Francesco), who presumably either found the manuscript, or brought it to Verona from some other place, or made a new copy of it.

Campesani was a supporter of Cangrande della Scala, whose Christian name also happens to be Francesco.
