= Albertino Mussato =

Italian statesman, writer and historian (1261-1329)

Albertino Mussato (1261–1329) was a statesman, poet, historian and playwright from Padua. He is credited with providing an impetus to the revival of literary Latin, and is characterized as an early humanist. He was influenced by his teacher, the Paduan poet and proto-humanist Lovato Lovati. Mussato influenced many humanists such as Petrarch.

A native of Padua and a member of its council, Mussato acted as an ambassador between Padua and Emperor Henry VII. He is a member of a group of Latin Paduan poets called the cenacolo padovano. Mussato is renowned for his Latin play Ecerinis, which was based on the tyrannical career of Ezzelino III da Romano. It was the first secular tragedy written since Roman times. Thus, it is considered to be the first Italian tragedy identifiable as a Renaissance work. Ecerinis is not only significant for its historical information, but is modeled after the Senecan tragedy and is an indication of the early revival of classical works and their form – a characteristic of the humanist movement.

Mussato received the poet laureate honour as a result of the literary and political qualities of his play. He was one of the first to receive this designation after the classical age. Mussato's other works are a corpus of letters, poetry, and historical works, including a chronicle of Henry VII's actions in Italy. In addition to his prolific writings, he was also a champion of poetry which he defended in a 1317 polemical exchange of letters with a Dominican friar, Giovannino of Mantua.

== Biography ==
=== Youth and early career ===
Albertino Mussato was born in Padua in 1261 in the district of Gazzo, at around the time of year when the grapes are harvested — which is typically between September and November. Much of the information on Mussato's life is chronicled in his autobiographical poem written in 1317: De Celebratione Suae Diei Nativitatis Fienda Vel Non (Whether His Birthday Ought to Be Celebrated or Not). He is the oldest of his siblings, having two younger brothers and one younger sister. His father was Giovanni Cavalieri, a court messenger, but there were rumours that Mussato is the illegitimate son of an adulterous union between Viviano Muso and Cavalieri's wife. These rumours arose because Mussato adopted the last name Muso in his early years, probably, though, as tribute to Viviano Muso, who provided protection to the Cavalieri family and stood as godfather to Mussato.

By 1276–7 Viviano Muso had died leaving Mussato and his family in a state of poverty. The responsibility of providing for the family came to rest upon Mussato and he became employed in book copying for students.

Later on he transitioned to working in the Paduan law courts with his first notarial document being done for Amerina Muso – Viviano Muso's widow. However, he lacked a formal education and was unable to become a judge and was confined to remain a notary. Around this time, it is possible that Mussato began his tutorship under Lovato Lovati.

Throughout the 1280s and 1290s Mussato continued his notary work, eventually receiving recognition and prestige for performing all his notarial duties with great ability. However, he himself remarks in De Celebratione that he felt he did not deserve such praises. Nevertheless, due to his recognition, Mussato was knighted and became a member of the Consiglio Maggiore of Padua and was nominated to become a miles pro commune in 1296, at the young age of 35.

In 1294, he married Mabilia Lemici, daughter of Guglielmo Dente Lemici (or illegitimate daughter according to Giovanni da Nono). He eventually moved to the area where the Lemici Palazzo was located and he became the legal guardian of Guglielmo II when Vitaliano, son of Guglielmo Lemici, died in 1310.

=== Padua and diplomacy ===
==== Ambassador to Boniface VIII ====
Mussato first known role in politics was in 1297 when he became Podestà of Lendinara. But his first notable role in politics was around the year 1300 and his first mission was as an ambassador to Pope Boniface VIII, most likely to try and influence the Pope to control the Inquisition that was happening in Padua at the time. During Mussato's mission to Pope Boniface VIII the previous abbot of Santa Giustina, Renaldo, died resulting in a disputed election for the ecclesiastical position. Mussato used his time as ambassador to Boniface to influence his decision over the election by promoting his brother, Gualpertino, for the role. Vitaliano Lemici, simultaneously, spent a fortune in promoting Gualpertino for the position. The issue was finally resolved on 17 February 1300, when Boniface announced in a letter that Gualpertino was the new abbot of Santa Giustina. In April 1301 Mussato was sent to Florence as Esecutore degli Ordinamenti di Giustizia (Executor of Judicial Ordinances) for a period of 6 months.

==== Ambassador to Henry VII ====
Mussato was later sent on four ambassadorial missions to Henry VII. On the first mission Mussato travelled as part of the Paduan representatives to the coronation of Henry VII in Milan in early January 1311. On his second journey to the Henry VII Mussato was assigned as chief ambassador and tasked with negotiating the independence of Padua. Certain conditions were placed before Padua as part of the negotiations: Padua was to have an Imperial Vicar, replacing the city's Podestà and to be nominated by the Emperor himself; Padua was also required to make occasional monetary tributes to the Emperor and his imperial court. However the Paduans were upset with these conditions and fearful of the favour given to Cangrande della Scala of Verona during these meetings, whom they saw as being the next Ezzelino III da Romano. The Paduans rejected these conditions and rallied the city into a state of defence. Vicenza, which had been under Paduan dominion for some time, took this opportunity to ally with della Scala and break free from Paduan supremacy on 15 April. Fearing for their independence and possible retribution by the Emperor the Paduans decided that the conditions presented to them were favourable and again sent Mussato and colleagues to meet with the Emperor resulting in compensation for those who suffered private losses in the Vicentini revolt and Padua officially attaching itself to the Holy Roman Empire on 16 June 1311. Mussato's last ambassadorial mission to Henry was to resolve the issue of property disputes between the Paduans and the Vicentini but he soon left the camp of the Emperor with only a rescript regarding the matter due to the Emperor's campaign to Rome stalled and continued to drag on with no end in sight.

=== Exile and death ===
In April 1314 there was a violent uprising against the rulers of Padua and Mussato was forced to flee to the village of Vigodarzere, but he was soon reconciled and allowed to return. Mussato wrote at the time that the conflict was between the Carraresi and the Altichini, however Giacomo da Carrara wrote to a nearby commune that the conflict was between him and Mussato. Mussato was later exiled in the spring of 1318 when Niccolò da Carrara attacked Gualpertino. Gualpertino fled first to the Lemici palazzo and then to the castle of Treville with his brother, Mussato, where a better chance for security was offered. Mussato was banished permanently in 1325 by the Carrara family and died four years later in Chioggia on 31 May at the age of 68.

== Politics ==
=== Ideological development ===
As he grew older Mussato's political stature grew substantially, not only with his fellow Paduans, but also with many individuals across Italy, and more specifically his peers. Often viewed as a patriot, Mussato was a prominent pre-humanist, who, fearing tyranny preferred a republic and became an influential political writer in his later adulthood. Born in Padua, Mussato was greatly influenced by his mentor and fellow Paduan Lovato Lovati. Lovati was influential in creating Mussato's political ideals that were based upon Lovati's personal experiences he built while living in Padua throughout Ezzelino da Romano's tyrannical reign as the leader of Padua. These experiences greatly affected Lovati's perspective, which in turn influenced Mussato to express his personal opinion on signorial monarchies. Through the teachings of Lovati, Mussato played a major role in influencing his friend Marsilius of Padua, the political philosopher. During Mussato's time in Padua he and his peers gathered regularly to discuss their ideals and help to spread the word of the humanists across Italy. This helped to solidify humanism as an important moral and political system in Padua and many other regions of Northern Italy during the early 14th century. Upon retiring from his legal career as a lawyer, Mussato began to focus on political life. He held multiple positions in the Paduan government and eventually served in the Consiglio Maggional (great council) of Padua. Mussato was also involved in numerous other diplomatic missions during his time in government as well as a part of multiple delegations for the city of Padua including the coronation of Henry VIII in Milan in 1312.

=== Mussato and contemporaries ===
Mussato, drew upon fellow scholars from across Italy to dissect multiple opinions and carve out his own political perspective. As Mussato developed his political agenda his writings became more politically driven, which increased his ability to persuade his fellow scholars to follow his beliefs. Mussato, along with a number of other political writers expressed a great deal of doubt in signorial monarchies during their regular council meetings. More than half a century after Ezzelino da Romano's reign ended, Mussato and other peers associated with pre-humanism still feared the threat of another potential tyrant in Cangrande della Scala and attempted to save the communal government of Padua. Mussato repeatedly equated the attempts of his fellow citizens to uphold their "res publica"(republic) in defense of liberty of their community against the challenge the della Scala family presented.

=== Political effects of his works ===
Mussato produced many works over his career including multiple pieces on influential people in his life (Lovati, Marsilius). He wrote various historiographical works with subtle political influence (e.g. Augusta de Gestis de Henrici VII), and incorporated political tragedies from the past (Seneca) to further cement his political arsenal. All of the works created by Mussato were minor in their political efforts in comparison to Ecerinis. After gaining inspiration from his incarceration, experiences and previous writings, he wrote Ecerinis. The most famous of Mussato's works contained writings of immense political magnitude that targeted Cangrande and angered the della Scala family. The remarks in Ecerenis eventually brought about Mussato's exile in 1325. Ecerinis was viewed as a clever means to undermine Cangrande and was actually quite successful at reaching its goal. Mussato's use of politically biased information is exemplified in Ecerinis when the messenger returns with the news of Ezzelino's gruesome death. This garners the following response from the Chorus:

Young men, together let us pay thanks befitting the giver of such great blessings….
May God, born of a Virgin, show his approval to the vows have addressed to him.

This statement clearly uses his death to vilify Ezzelino and warn citizens of Padua to avoid letting tyranny return with Cangrande. The whole structure of Ecerinis left little doubt of its political approach through the vilification of Ezzelino as a typical tyrant. Mussato's efforts came to fruition in that "the myth of Ezzelino" was created from his work and was used as a way to denounce Padua's seigniorial past. Mussato also used Ecerinis to express the desperation he faced in preserving communal rule in Padua. The play used many real life experiences to point to the dangerous effects of seigniorial rule on a city and foreshadowed the collapse of civic liberty in Padua. This was an attempt to inspire Paduans to stand up for their republic and regain the civic liberty they had lost. Ecerinis was also used as a warning to Cangrande to inform him that all tyrannical reigns end in death and ruin which will cause mass suffering for a variety of reasons.

=== Political consequences and political legacy ===
Ecerinis created a political legacy for Mussato that greatly benefited the longevity and importance of his works but also led to the undoing of his personal life. In 1318 Mussato was once again incarcerated for complaining about the loss of Padua's communal government and his political antics against the Carrara family after Giacoma da Carrara was named the delegate of the people in July 1318. Albertino Mussato was later exiled in 1325 where he continued to write pieces with subtle political messages. These works included Ludovicus Bavarius, ad Filium, a letter addressed Louis of Bavaria that dealt with the education of his son. The last works of Mussato exemplified his efforts to share his personal knowledge and beliefs with subtle political hints wherever applicable to as many individuals as possible. In 1329 Mussato died while in exile but not without affecting the lives of many Italians. He left behind a vast multifaceted literary and historical library with a strong political intent.

== Early humanism ==
=== Pre-humanism defined ===
Petrarch is popularly defined as the first humanist, however, figures such as Albertino Mussato, and his teacher Lovato Lovati are argued by many scholars to have preceded Petrarchan humanism in their use of classical works. Humanism, or "pre-humanism", began in Padua in the 1260s with Lovati modeling poems based on Ovid and Horace, followed by his pupil, Mussato, classicizing prose and modeling his play, Ecerinis, after the Senecan tragedy. The interest in classical works by the Northern Italians, is argued by Nicholas Mann to originate in the study of Roman Law, the Corpus Juris Civilis. Northern Italian early humanists, such as Lovati and Mussato, were often lawyers, and applied Roman law to contemporary legal situations. The lawyers studying these ancient Roman legal texts also became interested in other aspects of classical heritage: history and moral philosophy. The main interests of early humanists, such as Lovati and Mussato, did not lie in advocating for an emulation of historical Greece or Rome, but in the mythical worlds of Gods and heroes of classical Latin poetry. The early humanists did not have as romanticized a view of the superiority and glory of ancient societies, like later humanists such as Petrarch, as their works predominantly attempted to evoke the emotions and thoughts of ancient society. This is especially seen in Mussato's tragic play, Ecerinis, based on the Senecan tragedy. Overall, Lovati and Mussato contribute to features of later humanism, such as: the rejection of contemporary Latin, the appetite for classical texts, and the desire to both ascertain their meaning and imitate them. Later humanists, such as Petrarch and Dante are argued to be indebted to the works of the early Northern Italian humanists such as Lovati and Mussato.

=== Lovati and influence ===
Mussato was influenced by his teacher and contemporary, Lovato Lovati, a figure also associated with Northern Italian humanism. Lovati was one of the first to demonstrate "proto-humanism" and is known for the discovery of Seneca's plays as well as familiarity with ancient lyric poets such as Catullus, Tibullus, and Propertius. Later, Lovati's knowledge of classical works and figures would be highly praised by Petrarch, the "father of humanism". Connecting Lovati's influence to Mussato, lies in Mussato's most well known work, his play Ecerinis. Ecerinis was modeled after the Senecan tragedy unearthed by Lovati, showing that Lovati and Mussato were close contemporaries as well as sharing a student teacher relationship. They even made sobriquets, or nicknames for each other, which was also part of classical tradition. Lovati's was "Wolf", and Mussato's, "Little ass". Lovati believed Mussato showed great promise, as on his death bed, he told Mussato to put his poetic interests above his family, saying "since you are deemed gifted by the muses, by these you will be muse inspired. Ivy will circle your temples".

=== Classical influence in works ===
Mussato's most well known play, Ecerinis, was written in 1314. Modeled after the Senecan tragedy, as well as the first play to be composed in a classical metre since antiquity, it was the first tragic drama to emerge after Lovati unearthed Seneca's plays. The play was based specifically on the Senecan tragedies of Thyestes and Octavia. Ecerinis did not feature mythological characters, like Seneca's did, but dramatized historical events in Northern Italy and was based on the tyrannical career of Ezellino III de Romano. The play's objective was to warn Paduans of the danger of tyranny. Unlike later humanists, who cited classical works as examples of a glorious and far superior past, Mussato and early humanists were more concerned with the effects of the ancient tragic genre in evoking powerful emotions and moral lessons. Mussato stated that "the voice of the tragic poet makes minds strong when confronted by adversities, so that cowardly fear evaporates". Carolingian and 12th century "renaissances" did not do much to revive Roman dramatists, and Petrarchan humanists were overly concerned with advocating for classical works while not undermining Christianity. Ecerinis displays an early humanist use of the classics, as he took aspects from classical works, without advocating for the absolute supremacy of the classics. Mussato's use of both classical metre, and the ancient genre of Senecan tragedy, as well the attempted invocation of moral lessons from the tragic genre foreshadow aspects of Petrarchan humanism, and are an example of the beginning of the Petrarchan humanist movement.

=== Philosophy and characteristics ===
Medieval universities focused on the metrical and rhetorical features of writing, and this allowed early humanists, like Mussato, to recognize and emulate the verbal patterns of ancient poets. Mussato classicized Latin prose in his letters and plays, suggesting he rejected traditional medieval prose metric in favour of classical Latin. He was the first, besides Lovati, to use classicizing style in poetic letters, and in his use of classical Latin, displays a founding characteristic of later humanists in his rejection of the contemporary style of Latin in favour of classical Latin. As well as letters, emulation of classical authors and style also influenced Mussato in historical writing, as he acted as chronicler in works such as Historia Augusta which described events such as Henry IV's invasion of Brescia. Historia Augusta shows classical influence in Mussato's use of classical Latin stylistically, but also conceptually, as he drew on ancients such as Sallust in the inclusion of documents in the text, and Suetonius in his characterization of individuals. In terms of Christianity, Mussato was not overly religious, but believed in the connection between historical cycles and astrological theory. Mussato's belief in the connection between historical cycles and astrological theory can be seen in the following excerpt from his De Traditione:

"Paduan posterity might observe the fortune of their city, as it were, imposed by nature herself and the fatal sentence of its own history, whether on account of the location of the land or by a fluctuation of some kind of elements or by some sort of disposition concealed from mortals".

In defense of the un-Christian nature of ancient poets, Mussato invoked Aristotle and argued that poets were the first theologians. He also argued that poetry was not a vehicle for expressing God's word, but contained allegorical representations pertaining to divinity and God's creatures. Mussato blurred the line between poetry and theology, stressing continuity between ancient poetry and the Bible. However, Mussato's later works were more traditionally Christian in nature, perhaps owing to Mussato's old age and a desire to reconcile with the medieval Christian hierarchy.

=== Legacy ===
Petrarch owed much to the early Northern Italian humanists, in their emulation, recovery and use of ancient works. Later, Petrarch would praise the works of Mussato's teacher, Lovato Lovati. As well as praise for Lovati, the humanist Colossi Salutati told Bartolomeo Oliari that his coronation of the laurel crown was due to Mussato's influence, when he wrote that "the first cultivator of eloquence was your compatriot Mussato of Padua". Theologians, monks and clergy criticized later humanists because the church believed that the study of classical poetry distracted men from religion. These later humanists, such as Petrarch and Boccacio defended the use of classical poetry the same way Mussato did several decades before by arguing that the allegorical truths classical works portrayed had contemporary relevance. Petrarch consciously echoed Mussato in both the defense, and ceremony of ancient poetry, and Mussato's tragedy Ecerinis has been cited as the work to popularize tragedy, and inspire Shakespeare's Richard the III to be modeled after the Senecan tragedy.

== Works ==
Albertino Mussato followed closely in the example of his teacher Lovati. They both imitated the classics and emulated the writings from Roman writers of antiquity such as Seneca and Livy. However, Ronald Witt remarks that their writings were not completely classicized. He writes about how earlier humanists such as Mussato and Lovati (among others) relied on classic Roman works and drew on them for inspiration but they "showed little interest in investigating the nature of the society that produced them."

The works of Mussato and his contemporaries serve as a springboard for the later humanist movement where writers took a further step and tried to recreate the past of ancient Rome through fervent imitation. The early stages of humanism are evident in works such as Mussato's poem dedicated to Henry VII (Poem 33). This poem is written in sonnet-form – a vernacular aesthetic of Northern Italy in the early 14th century – but its text is written in a classicizing style. Mussato received the poet laurel on 5 December 1315 as a result of his influential tragedy Ecerinis and his work on the chronicle of Henry VII's Italian expedition titled Historia Augusta (or De gestis Henrici septimi Cesaris).

Mussato's works were written during the early 14th century in Italy. Mussato would probably have written his own manuscripts since he had experience as a copyist and as a notary. His manuscripts were printed as a part of Lodovico Antonio Muratori's Rerum Italicarum Scriptores (Writers on Italian Affairs). This was an eighteenth-century collection of "chronicles, diaries, and legal documents" from the years 500 – 1500. Some of Mussato's works are included in the tenth volume of this collection. Mussato's writings have been reprinted multiple times since then and some of his original manuscripts are held in the library at the University of Padua.

=== Drama: Ecerinis ===
==== Background ====
Ecerinis (c. 1314) was Mussato's Latin verse tragedy modeled after Seneca's Thyestes. Many scholars cite the play as being "the earliest post-Ancient tragedy." It is unknown when Mussato first began composing the play but he completed it after his release from Cangrande I della Scala's prison. Just as Seneca's tragedies describe the descent and ruin of monarchs, Mussato focused his play around the fall of Ezzelino III da Romano. Mussato's main source for information on Ezzelino was Rolandino of Padua's Cronica in factis et circa facta Marchie Trivixane (c. 1262).

Ecerinis is a work that contains a political message against Cangrande I who was trying to invade Padua during this period. Mussato's invocation of Ezzelino in his adaptation of historical events serves as a warning for Paduans of the new tyrant threatening their city. The following lines from the play support this theory.

[Messenger:] O, Verona, always the ancient scourge of this march,
dwelling-place of enemies and road to wars, seat of tyranny. (174–176)

The play was so popular and influential that it contributed to Mussato's success in the revival of classicized writings and his receiving the poet laureate honor from the bishop and municipality of Padua. Furthermore, the play's importance was underscored when a law was passed stating that the play was to be read every Christmas as a means of reinforcing Paduan patriotism.

==== Text ====
The play consists of "five acts, a small cast, chorus of Paduans, and a boastful cruel protagonist". The ruler is explicitly named Ezzelino and is described as being the son of the devil. The chorus is made of the Paduan citizens who play a large role in the plot and literary scholars have noted that the chorus is the moral voice of the play. The events of the five acts take place over a period of approximately 24 years and the setting frequently changes.

In Act 1, Ezzelino's mother informs him and his brother that their father is, in fact, a demon. Ezzelino and his brother are happy and Ezzelino prays to his father. The act ends with the Chorus lamenting the future. By the second act, Ezzelino is described as having taken over Verona and Padua in the space of a few days. The Chorus also appears at the end of Act 2 to lament the turn of events. In Act 3, expatriates retake Padua with the help from "troops of Venice, Ferrare, and the Pope." Act 4 brings about Ezzelino's death and by the end of Act 5, his family are killed. The Chorus ends the play.

Ecerinis is written in Latin verse and follows a Senecan model in its rhyme scheme. For example, the dialogues are written in iambic trimeter and the chorus is written using "a pattern of Sapphic, Adonic, and anapest". The themes of the play are reflected within the following lines where Mussato warns against the danger of a power-hungry tyrant:

At what risks do you seek the heights of treacherous power? (118–119)

Always watchful, he [(Ezzelino)] fears and is feared. (257)

Witt describes the play as being "unquestionably a Christian drama" because of the appeals made to Christ but that this is not an indication of Mussato being devoutly Christian. Witt attributes the religious aspect of the work to the specifications of the genre wherein "divine interventions are standard elements."

=== Histories ===
Much of the information on 14th century northern Italy comes from Mussato's histories such as the Historia Augusta Henrici VII Caesaris (History of Henry VII) and the De Gestis Italicorum Post Henricum VII Caesarem (Concerning the Deeds of the Italians after Emperor Henry VII). The former is an account of Emperor Henry VII's expedition to Italy from 1310 to 1313 and the latter is an account of Italian politics "from August 1313 to at least July 1321".

Henry VII's expedition to gain control over Italy was met with little resistance in Padua and other cities in Northern Italy. The papacy at this time resided in Avignon and cities that promoted Henry VII's expedition did so in hopes of returning the control of the papacy back to Rome. The city submitted to his rule and Mussato's writing about him suggests that he also supported Henry VII even though the "Italian prince" made multiple mistakes in his dealings with the Italians.

Some of his other prose historical works include a work about Louis of Bavaria (Ludovicus Bavarus, ad filium) and his last work, which he finished writing in the first months of 1329, concerning Padua's fall to Cangrande (De Traditione Patavii ad Canem Grandem Anno 1328 Mense Septembris et Causis Precedentibus). Mussato also wrote historical accounts in verse form. Some examples of his historical poems are Poem 33 and a poem titled De Obsidione Domini Canis Grandis de Verona circa Moenia Paduanae Civitatis et Conflictu Ejus (Of Cangrande's Besieging the Walls of the City of Padua and of Its Fight) (c. 1325). The next major historian of Padua after him, Guglielmo Cortusi, took a decidedly friendlier view of the Carraresi.

==== Historia Augusta ====
The influence behind Mussato's writing style and forms in his Historia Augusta can be traced back to ancient historians such as Livy, Sallust, Caesar, and Suetonius. Aspects of Mussato's history included documents in the text and vivid characterizations of the people he wrote about – all features that can be traced back to writers like Sallust and Suetonius. Mussato's history is also characterized by scholars for its clarity in the description of the chronological flow of events with clear causes and effects outlined by Mussato.

Below are the first few lines of the Historia Augusta and Witt notes that they are reminiscent of Julius Caesar's commentaria because they "emphasized the geographical setting of the narrative."

Lucembore oppidum est Francorum fines a Germanis
Distinguens, a telluris sterilitate nomen accipiens.

Translation:

Luxembourg is a town separating the borders of the French from the Germans,
taking its name from the sterility of the soil.

=== Poetry and letters ===
Mussato's poetry and letters are interconnected because not only did Mussato write some of his letters in verse(for example, Letters 4, 7, and 18), but he also defended poetry against Friar Giovanni of Mantua's attack (Epistola 18). Giovanni's claims on the danger of poetry to Christianity were rebuffed by Mussato who asserted that, like the Bible, poetry was inspired by God. The format of Mussato's letters reflects how he followed in the tradition of ars dictaminis, a method of letter writing that was a part of school curricula during Mussato's lifetime. In Mussato's defence of poetry, he says that it is "divina ars, altera philosophia, and theologia mundi.(Epistola 18,83–85)." In doing so he refers to poetry as a work of divinity and thus, fuses poetry with philosophy and theology into what Curtis calls "theological poetics". Mussato's merging of poetry and religion defies the medieval understanding of poetry – which places poetry within the fields of grammar, rhetoric, and scholasticism – and "[allied] him with the Christian apologetic tradition."

==== De Celebratione ====
De Celebratione Suae Diei Nativitatis Fienda Vel Non (Whether His Birthday Ought to Be Celebrated or Not)was Mussato's autobiographical work "written in 1317, when Mussato was 56 years old". Mussato provides readers with his age at the beginning of the poem and he details his age by using an anno domini designation with his reference to the birth of Christ.

Sexta dies haec est, sunt quinquagesima nobis
(Tempora narrabat si mihi vera Parens)
Musta reconduntur vasis septemque decemque
Nune nova post ortum mille trecenta Deum.

If my parents truly told me the right time, one thousand three hundred and seventeen new vintages have been closed in jars since the birth of God.

Witt notes that Mussato is "the first person whom we know of since antiquity to celebrate his birthday." In the last half of his poem, Mussato's writing focuses on his regrets and a wish to have no more birthdays because of the risk of "adding evil deeds to his already heavy tally." This poem follows in the confessional genre and the lament at the close indicates Mussato's wish for a better afterlife.

Mors licet accedat melioris nuntia vitae
nostra tamen iuris tunc erit umbra sui.

Let Death, the messenger of a better life, approach, but I will then be a shade within his domain.

==== Poem 33 ====
This poem was dedicated to Henry VII and is notable for its classicized meter and language. However, it relies on a sonnet-like form which can be attributed to vernacular influences in Musatto's period.

Anxia Cesareas sese convertit ad arces:
Romulidum veteres occubuere patres.
Suspicis Adriacis dominantem fluctibus urbem?
Praemia castalio sunt ibi nulla deo.
Occidit in terris, si quis fuit em[p]tor Agavae,
Et Maecenatem non habet ulla domus.
Territus effugio pennati stagna caballi:
Judicat unfirmas has Gaelinus aquas
Cumque vetet princeps immunes esse poetas,
A Tritone rubri me trahit unda Tagi.
Frons, Henrice, mee satis est incomta Camene,
Lecta tamen veri nuntia fida soni.
Et michi grata tamen; saltem quia reddet amicum
Me tibi, sulcandum iam bene stravit iter.

Translation:

My anxious muse looks toward Caesarian heights;
the ancient Roman fathers have gone to their rest.
Do you mistrust the city dominating the waves of the Adriatic?
There are no prizes here for the Apollonian god.
If someone has purchased Agave, he has died on land
and no house has a Maecenas.
Terrified, I flee the swap of the winged horse.
Galen considers these waters dangerous to the health
And since a prince refuses to give immunity to poets,
the wave of the red Tagus draws me from Athens.
The brow of my song, O Henry, is rather rough;
yet it is read as the faithful messenger of true sound
and is pleasing to me; at least, because it will give me as a friend to you,
it has already laid open the way to be plowed.

== Notes ==
=== References ===
- Ascoli, Albert Russell (2009). "Blinding the Cyclops: Petrarch after Dante". In Zygmunt G. Barański; Theodore J. Cachey, Jr. (eds.). Petrarch and Dante: AntiDantism, Metaphysics, Tradition. University of Notre Dame Press. pp. 114–173. ISBN 978-0-268-02211-2.
- Grund, Gary R. (2011). Humanist Tragedies. Cambridge, MA: Harvard University Press. ISBN 9780674057258.
- Herde, Peter (2008). "From Adolf of Nassau to Lewis of Bavaria, 1292–1347". In Michael Jones (ed.). The New Cambridge Medieval History. Vol. 6. Cambridge: Cambridge University Press. pp. 515–550. doi:10.1017/CHOL9780521362900.024. ISBN 9780521362900.
- Hyde, John Kenneth (1966). Padua in the Age of Dante. Manchester: Manchester University Press.
- Kohl, Benjamin G. (1998). Padua Under the Carrara, 1318–1405. Johns Hopkins University Press.
- Mann, Nicholas (2011). "The origins of humanism". In Jill Kraye (ed.). The Cambridge Companion to Renaissance Humanism. Cambridge: Cambridge University Press. pp. 1–19. doi:10.1017/CCOL0521430380.001. ISBN 9780521430388.
- Schildgen, Brenda Deen (2009). "Poetry and theology in the fourteenth century". Religion & Literature. 41 (2): 136–142. JSTOR 25676897.
- Skinner, Quentin (2002). Renaissance Virtues. Visions of Politics. Vol. 2. New York: Cambridge University Press. ISBN 9780521589253.
- Syros, Vasileios (2012). Marsilius of Padua at the Intersection of Ancient and Medieval Traditions of Political Thought. Toronto: University of Toronto Press. ISBN 9781442641440.
- Walker, Joseph Cooper (1805). An Historical and Critical Essay on the Revival of the Drama in Italy. Edinburgh: Mundell and Son.
- Weiss, Roberto (1947). The Dawn of Humanism in Italy: an Inaugural Lecture. New York: Haskell House Publishers.
- Wicksteed, Philip H.; Gardner, Edmund G. (1970). Dante and Giovanni del Virgilio: Including a Critical Ed. of the Text of Dante's "Eclogae Latinae" and of the Poetic Remains of Giovanni Del Virgilio. New York: Haskell House.
- Witt, Ronald G. (2000). In the Footsteps of the Ancients: the Origins of Humanism from Lovato to Bruni. Leiden: Brill. ISBN 9789004113978.
