= Renaissance humanism =

Revival in the study of Classical antiquity

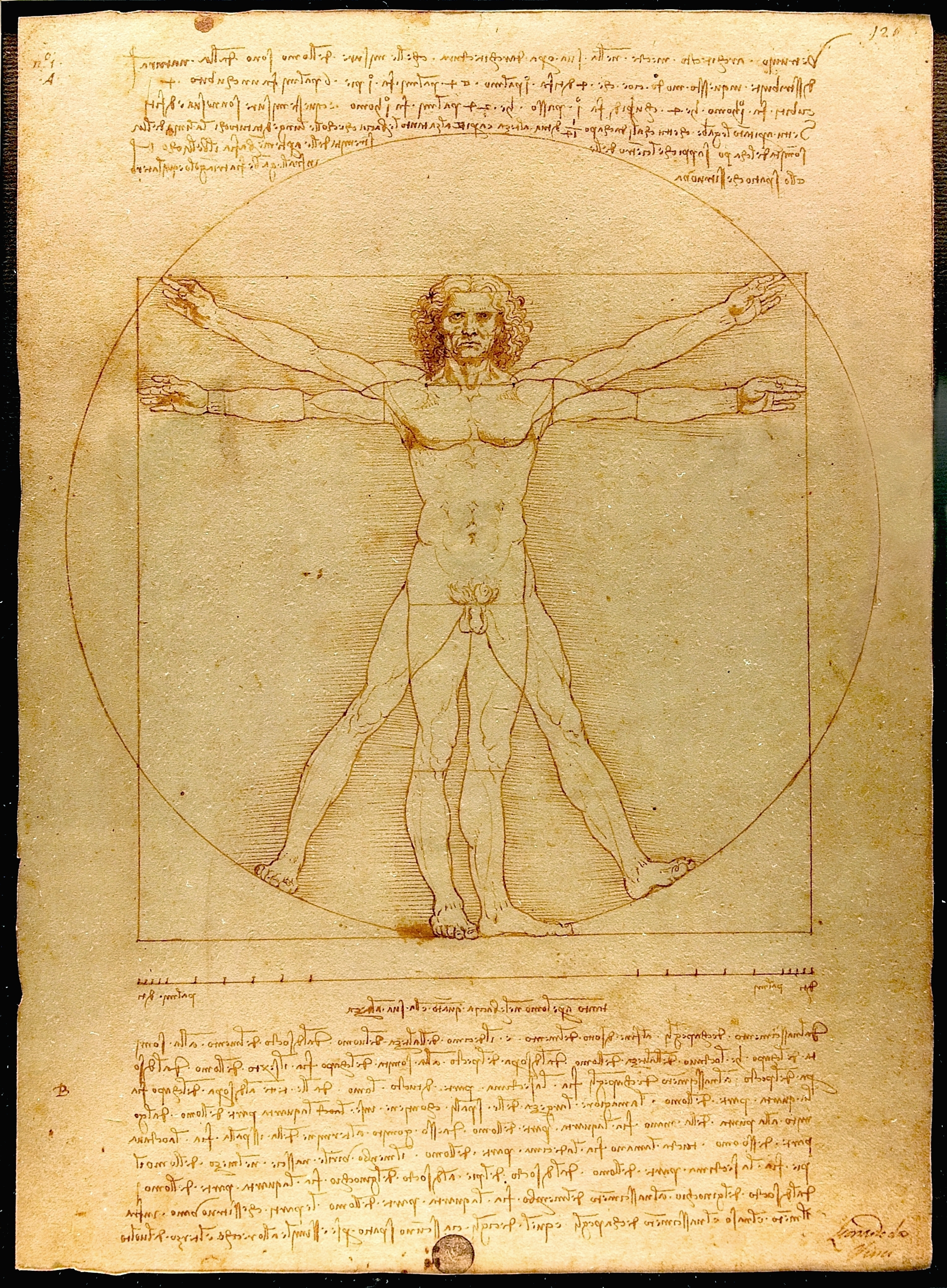
Leonardo da Vinci's Vitruvian Man (c. 1490) shows the correlations of ideal human body proportions with geometry described by the ancient Roman architect Vitruvius in his De Architectura. In his explicit turn back to an ancient model in search of knowledge and wisdom, Leonardo follows early humanist practice. What he finds in Vitruvius is a mathematical formula for the proportions of all parts of the human body, which results in its idealized representation as the true microcosmic measure of all things. [...]The perfection of this ideal human form corresponds visually to the early humanist belief in the unique central placement of human beings within the divine universal order and their consequent human grandeur and dignity, expressed in the philosopher Pico della Mirandola's Oration on the Dignity of Man (1486), known as the manifesto of the Renaissance. — Anne Hudson Jones

Renaissance humanism is a worldview centered on the nature and importance of humanity that emerged from the study of classical antiquity.

Renaissance humanists sought to create a citizenry able to speak and write with eloquence and clarity, and thus capable of engaging in the civic life of their communities and persuading others to virtuous and prudent actions. Humanism, while set up by a small elite who had access to books and education, was intended as a cultural movement to influence all of society. It was a program to revive the cultural heritage, literary legacy, and moral philosophy of the Greco-Roman civilization.

It first began in Italy and then spread across Western Europe in the 14th, 15th, and 16th centuries. During the period, the term humanist (Italian: umanista) referred to teachers and students of the humanities, known as the studia humanitatis, which included the study of Latin and Greek literatures, grammar, rhetoric, history, poetry, and moral philosophy. It was not until the 19th century that this began to be called humanism instead of the original humanities, and later by the retronym Renaissance humanism to distinguish it from later humanist developments.

During the Renaissance period most humanists were Christians, so their concern was to "purify and renew Christianity", not to do away with it. Their vision was to return ad fontes ("to the pure sources") to the Gospels, the New Testament and the Church Fathers, bypassing the complexities of medieval Christian theology.

== Definition ==
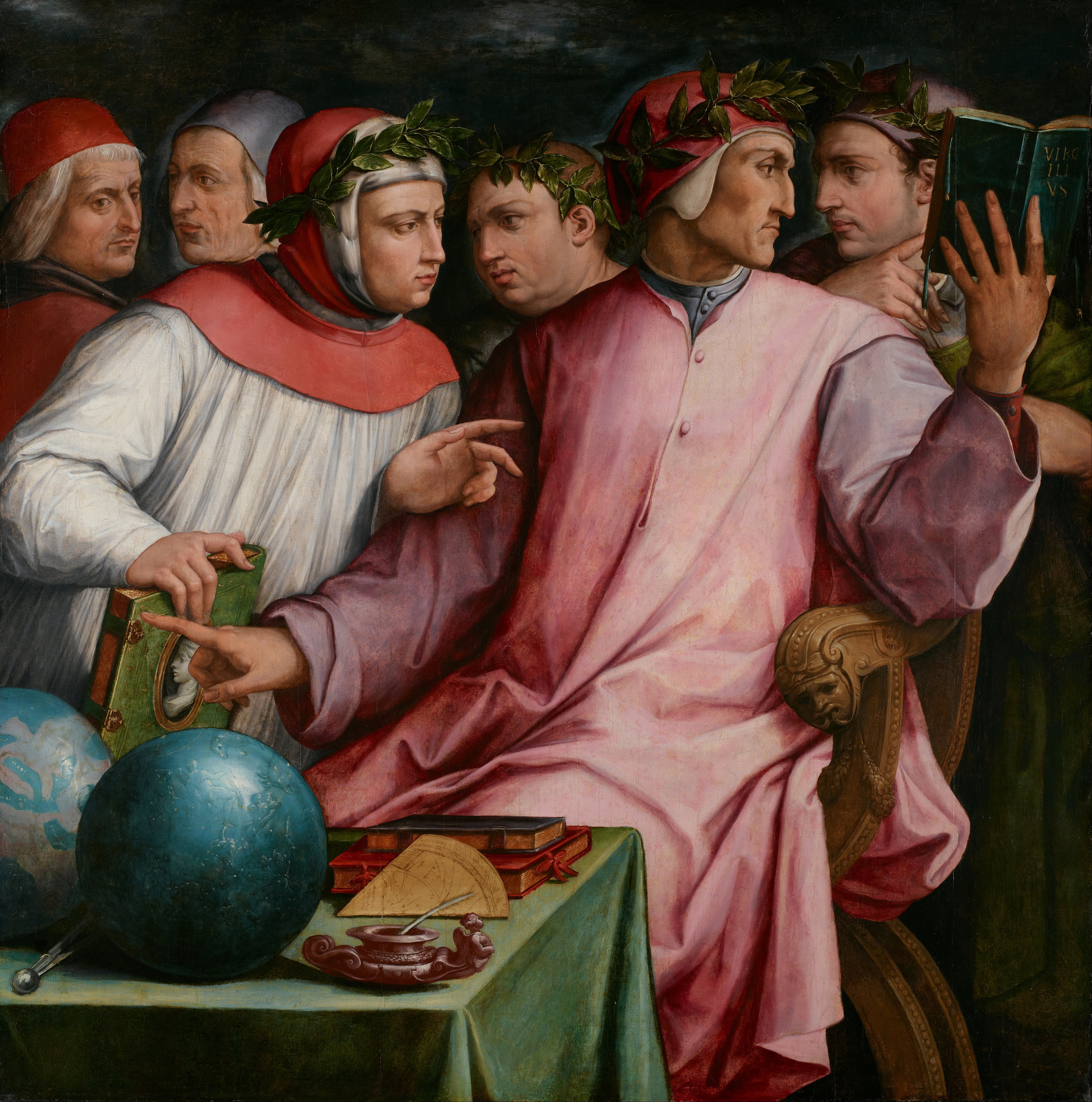
Medieval and Renaissance Italian writers portrayed by Giorgio Vasari in Six Tuscan Poets (1544). From left to right: Cristoforo Landino, Marsilio Ficino, Francesco Petrarca, Giovanni Boccaccio, Dante Alighieri, and Guido Cavalcanti.

Very broadly, the project of the Italian Renaissance humanists of the fourteenth and fifteenth centuries was the studia humanitatis: the study of the humanities, "a curriculum focusing on language skills." This project sought to recover the culture of ancient Greece and Rome through its literature and philosophy and to use this classical revival to imbue the ruling classes with the moral attitudes of said ancients—a project James Hankins calls one of "virtue politics." But what this studia humanitatis actually constituted is a subject of much debate. According to one scholar of the movement,

Early Italian humanism, which in many respects continued the grammatical and rhetorical traditions of the Middle Ages, not merely provided the old Trivium with a new and more ambitious name (Studia humanitatis), but also increased its actual scope, content and significance in the curriculum of the schools and universities and in its own extensive literary production. The studia humanitatis excluded logic, but they added to the traditional grammar and rhetoric not only history, Greek, and moral philosophy, but also made poetry, once a sequel of grammar and rhetoric, the most important member of the whole group.

However, in investigating this definition in his article "The changing concept of the studia humanitatis in the early Renaissance," Benjamin G. Kohl provides an account of the various meanings the term took on over the course of the period.

- Around the middle of the fourteenth century, when the term first came into use among Italian literati, it was used in reference to a very specific text: as praise of the cultural and moral attitudes expressed in Cicero's Pro Archia poeta (62 BCE).
- Tuscan humanist Coluccio Salutati popularized the term in the 1370s, using the phrase to refer to culture and learning as a guide to moral life, with a focus on rhetoric and oration. Over the years, he came to use it specifically in literary praise of his contemporaries, but later viewed the studia humanitatis as a means of editing and restoring ancient texts and even understanding scripture and other divine literature.
- But it was not until the beginning of the quattrocento (15th century) that the studia humanitatis began to be associated with particular academic disciplines, when Pier Paolo Vergerio, in his De ingenuis moribus, stressed the importance of rhetoric, history, and moral philosophy as a means of moral improvement.
- By the middle of the century, the term was adopted more formally, as it started to be used in Bologna and Padua in reference to university courses that taught these disciplines as well as Latin poetry, before then spreading northward throughout Italy.
- But the first instance of it as encompassing grammar, rhetoric, history, poetry, and moral philosophy all together only came when Tommaso Parentucelli wrote to Cosimo de' Medici with recommendations regarding his library collection, saying, "de studiis autem humanitatis quantum ad grammaticam, rhetoricam, historicam et poeticam spectat ac moralem" ("concerning studies of the humanities, insofar as they [consist of] grammar, rhetoric, history and poetry, and also ethics").

And so, the term studia humanitatis took on a variety of meanings over the centuries, being used differently by humanists across the various Italian city-states as one definition got adopted and spread across the country. Still, it has referred consistently to a mode of learning—formal or not—that results in one's moral edification.

Under the influence and inspiration of the classics, Renaissance humanists developed a new rhetoric and new learning. Some scholars also argue that humanism articulated new moral and civic perspectives, and values offering guidance in life to all citizens. Renaissance humanism was a response to what came to be depicted by later whig historians as the "narrow pedantry" associated with medieval scholasticism.

== History ==
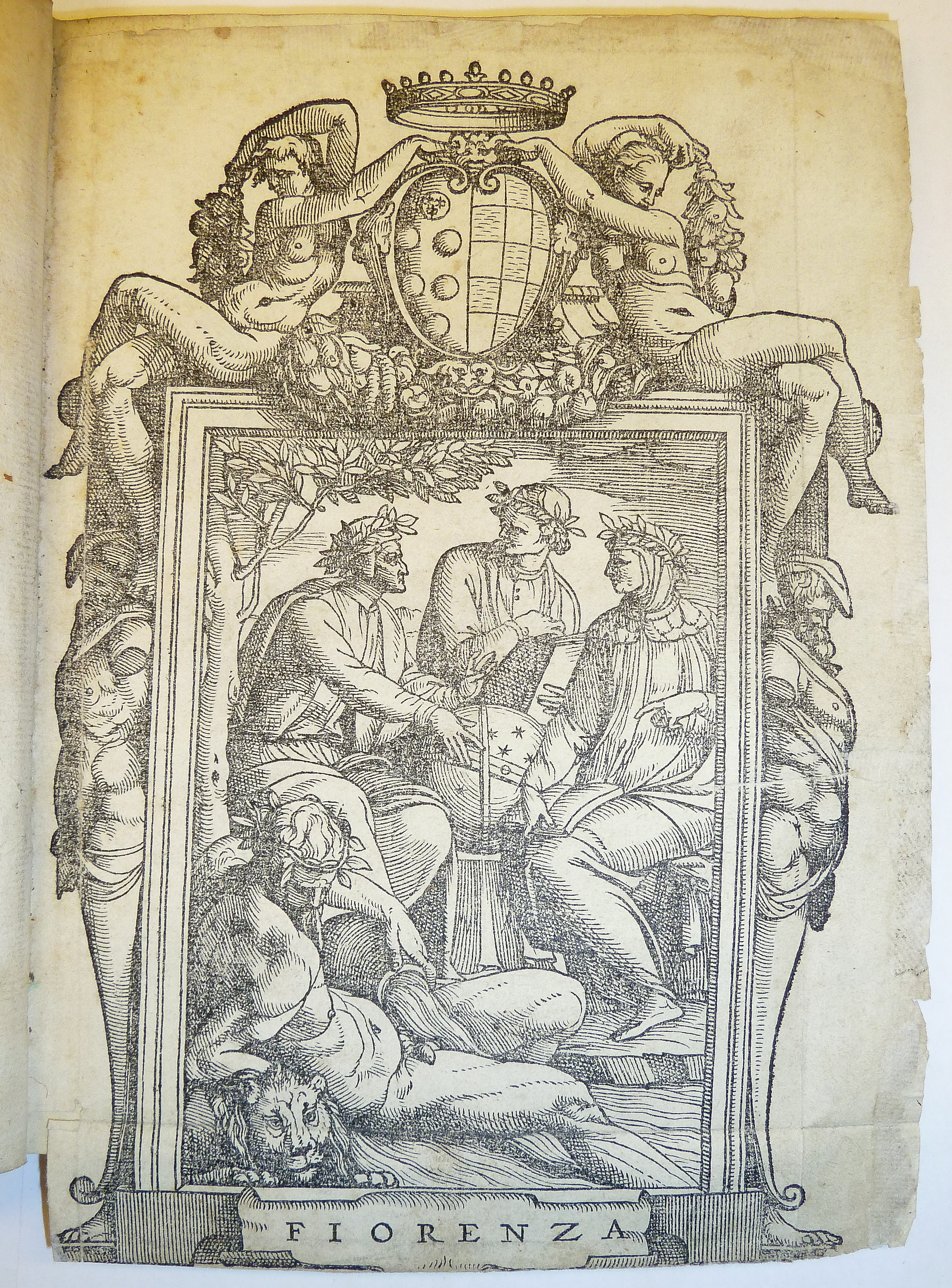
Frontispiece depicting Dante Alighieri, Giovanni Boccaccio, and Francesco Petrarca with the coat of arms of the Medici–Toledo family on top

In the last years of the 13th century and in the first decades of the 14th century, the cultural climate was changing in some European regions. The rediscovery, study, and renewed interest in authors who had been forgotten, and in the classical world that they represented, inspired a flourishing return to linguistic, stylistic and literary models of antiquity. There emerged a consciousness of the need for a cultural renewal, which sometimes also meant a detachment from contemporary culture. Manuscripts and inscriptions were in high demand and graphic models were also imitated. This "return to the ancients" was the main component of so-called "pre-humanism", which developed particularly in Tuscany, in the Veneto region, and at the papal court of Avignon, through the activity of figures such as Lovato Lovati and Albertino Mussato in Padua, Landolfo Colonna in Avignon, Ferreto de' Ferreti in Vicenza, Convenevole from Prato in Tuscany and then in Avignon, and many others.

By the 14th century some of the first humanists were great collectors of antique manuscripts, including Petrarch, Giovanni Boccaccio, Coluccio Salutati, and Poggio Bracciolini. Of the four, Petrarch was dubbed the "Father of Humanism," as he was the one who first encouraged the study of pagan civilizations and the teaching of classical virtues as a means of preserving Christianity. He also had a library, of which many manuscripts did not survive. Many worked for the Catholic Church and were in holy orders, like Petrarch, while others were lawyers and chancellors of Italian cities, and thus had access to book copying workshops, such as Petrarch's disciple Salutati, the Chancellor of Florence.

In Italy, the humanist educational program won rapid acceptance and, by the mid-15th century, many of the upper classes had received humanist educations, possibly in addition to traditional scholastic ones. Some of the highest officials of the Catholic Church were humanists with the resources to amass important libraries. Such was Cardinal Basilios Bessarion, a convert to the Catholic Church from Greek Orthodoxy, who was considered for the papacy, and was one of the most learned scholars of his time. There were several 15th-century and early 16th-century humanist popes one of whom, Aeneas Silvius Piccolomini (Pope Pius II), was a prolific author and wrote a treatise on The Education of Boys. These subjects came to be known as the humanities, and the movement which they inspired is shown as humanism.

The migration waves of Byzantine Greek scholars and émigrés in the period following the Crusader sacking of Constantinople and the end of the Byzantine Empire in 1453 was a very welcome addition to the Latin texts scholars like Petrarch had found in monastic libraries for the revival of Greek literature and science via their greater familiarity with ancient Greek works. They included Gemistus Pletho, George of Trebizond, Theodorus Gaza, and John Argyropoulos.

There were important centres of Renaissance humanism in Bologna, Ferrara, Florence, Genoa, Livorno, Mantua, Padua, Pisa, Naples, Rome, Siena, Venice, Vicenza, and Urbino.

Italian humanism spread to Spain, with Francisco de Vitoria becoming its first great exponent. His work on the rights of the Spanish subjects in America, which became seminal, earned him being called the father of modern international law. He founded the School of Salamanca, of which Antonio de Nebrija became one of its main members. A circle of humanists also formed around King of Spain and Holy Roman Emperor Charles V, with names like Alfonso and Juan de Valdés, Juan Luis Vives and Luisa Sigea. Charles appointed another noted humanist, Mercurino di Gattinara, as his chancellor. The Valdés brothers, Gattinara and Antonio de Guevara were proponents of working towards the restoration of a Christian, universal Roman Empire, an idea originally inspired by Dante Alighieri in his Monarchia. Spain's perennial state of war, in conflicts like the Italian Wars and the Ottoman-Habsburg Wars, favored a militant conception of humanism known as las armas y las letras ("the weapons and the letters"), first codified in Charles' court by Baldassare Castiglione.

Humanism also spread northward to France, Germany, the Low Countries, Poland-Lithuania, Hungary and England with the adoption of large-scale printing after 1500, and it became associated with the Reformation. In France, pre-eminent humanist Guillaume Budé (1467–1540) applied the philological methods of Italian humanism to the study of antique coinage and to legal history, composing a detailed commentary on Justinian's Code. Budé was a royal absolutist (and not a republican like the early Italian umanisti) who was active in civic life, serving as a diplomat for Francis I and helping to found the Collège des Lecteurs Royaux (later the Collège de France). Meanwhile, Marguerite de Navarre, the sister of Francis I, was a poet, novelist, and religious mystic who gathered around her and protected a circle of vernacular poets and writers, including Clément Marot, Pierre de Ronsard, and François Rabelais.

== Paganism and Christianity in the Renaissance ==
Many humanists were churchmen, most notably popes Pius II, Sixtus IV, and Leo X, and there was often patronage of humanists by senior church figures. Much humanist effort went into improving the understanding and translations of Biblical and early Christian texts, both before and after the Reformation, which was greatly influenced by the work of non-Italian, Northern European figures such as Erasmus, Jacques Lefèvre d'Étaples, William Grocyn, and Swedish Catholic Archbishop in exile Olaus Magnus.

=== Description ===
The Cambridge Dictionary of Philosophy describes the rationalism of ancient writings as having tremendous impact on Renaissance scholars:

Here, one felt no weight of the supernatural pressing on the human mind, demanding homage and allegiance. Humanity—with all its distinct capabilities, talents, worries, problems, possibilities—was the center of interest. It has been said that medieval thinkers philosophised on their knees, but, bolstered by the new studies, they dared to stand up and to rise to full stature.

In 1417, for example, Poggio Bracciolini discovered the manuscript of Lucretius, De rerum natura, which had been lost for centuries and which contained an explanation of Epicurean doctrine, though at the time this was not commented on much by Renaissance scholars, who confined themselves to remarks about Lucretius's grammar and syntax.

Only in 1564 did French commentator Denys Lambin (1519–1572) announce in the preface to the work that "he regarded Lucretius's Epicurean ideas as 'fanciful, absurd, and opposed to Christianity'." Lambin's preface remained standard until the nineteenth century. Epicurus's unacceptable doctrine that pleasure was the highest good "ensured the unpopularity of his philosophy". Lorenzo Valla, however, puts a defense of epicureanism in the mouth of one of the interlocutors of one of his dialogues.

=== Epicureanism ===
Charles Trinkhaus regards Valla's "epicureanism" as a ploy, not seriously meant by Valla, but designed to refute Stoicism, which he regarded together with epicureanism as equally inferior to Christianity. Valla's defense, or adaptation, of Epicureanism was later taken up in The Epicurean by Erasmus, the "Prince of humanists:"

If people who live agreeably are Epicureans, none are more truly Epicurean than the righteous and godly. And if it is names that bother us, no one better deserves the name of Epicurean than the revered founder and head of the Christian philosophy Christ, for in Greek epikouros means "helper". He alone, when the law of Nature was all but blotted out by sins, when the law of Moses incited to lists rather than cured them, when Satan ruled in the world unchallenged, brought timely aid to perishing humanity. Completely mistaken, therefore, are those who talk in their foolish fashion about Christ's having been sad and gloomy in character and calling upon us to follow a dismal mode of life. On the contrary, he alone shows the most enjoyable life of all and the one most full of true pleasure.

This passage exemplifies the way in which the humanists saw pagan classical works, such as the philosophy of Epicurus, as being in harmony with their interpretation of Christianity.

=== Neo-Platonism ===
Renaissance Neo-Platonists such as Marsilio Ficino (whose translations of Plato's works into Latin were still used into the 19th century) attempted to reconcile Platonism with Christianity, according to the suggestions of early Church Fathers Lactantius and Saint Augustine. In this spirit, Pico della Mirandola attempted to construct a syncretism of religions and philosophies with Christianity, but his work did not win favor with the church authorities, who rejected it because of his views on magic.

== Evolution and reception ==
The historian of the Renaissance Sir John Hale cautions against too direct a linkage between Renaissance humanism and modern uses of the term humanism: "Renaissance humanism must be kept free from any hint of either 'humanitarianism' or 'humanism' in its modern sense of rational, non-religious approach to life ... the word 'humanism' will mislead ... if it is seen in opposition to a Christianity its students in the main wished to supplement, not contradict, through their patient excavation of the sources of ancient God-inspired wisdom."

=== Individual freedom ===
Historian Steven Kreis expresses a widespread view (derived from the 19th-century Swiss historian Jacob Burckhardt), when he writes that:

The period from the fourteenth century to the seventeenth worked in favor of the general emancipation of the individual. The city-states of northern Italy had come into contact with the diverse customs of the East, and gradually permitted expression in matters of taste and dress. The writings of Dante, and particularly the doctrines of Petrarch and humanists like Machiavelli, emphasized the virtues of intellectual freedom and individual expression. In the essays of Montaigne the individualistic view of life received perhaps the most persuasive and eloquent statement in the history of literature and philosophy.

Two noteworthy trends in some Renaissance humanists were Renaissance Neo-Platonism and Hermeticism, which through the works of figures like Nicholas of Kues, Giordano Bruno, Cornelius Agrippa, Campanella and Giovanni Pico della Mirandola sometimes came close to constituting a new religion itself. Of these two, Hermeticism has had great continuing influence in Western thought, while the former mostly dissipated as an intellectual trend, leading to movements in Western esotericism such as Theosophy and New Age thinking. The "Yates thesis" of Frances Yates holds that before falling out of favour, esoteric Renaissance thought introduced several concepts that were useful for the development of scientific method, though this remains a matter of controversy.

=== Sixteenth century and beyond ===
Though humanists continued to use their scholarship in the service of the church into the middle of the sixteenth century and beyond, the sharply confrontational religious atmosphere following the Reformation resulted in the Counter-Reformation that sought to silence challenges to Catholic theology, with similar efforts among the Protestant denominations. Some humanists, even moderate Catholics such as Erasmus, risked being declared heretics for their perceived criticism of the institutional church.

A number of humanists joined the Reformation movement and took over leadership functions, for example, Philipp Melanchthon, Ulrich Zwingli, Henry VIII, John Calvin, and William Tyndale. Others, like Jacques Lefèvre d'Étaples, were favorable to it although they remained Catholic.

With the Counter-Reformation initiated by the Council of Trent (1545–1563), positions hardened and a strict Catholic orthodoxy based on scholastic philosophy was imposed. However the education systems developed by Jesuits ran on humanist lines.

== Historiography ==
=== Baron thesis ===
Hans Baron (1900–1988) was the inventor of the now ubiquitous term "civic humanism." First coined in the 1920s and based largely on his studies of Leonardo Bruni, Baron's "thesis" proposed the existence of a central strain of humanism, particularly in Florence and Venice, dedicated to republicanism.

As argued in his chef-d'œuvre, The Crisis of the Early Italian Renaissance: Civic Humanism and Republican Liberty in an Age of Classicism and Tyranny, the German historian thought that civic humanism originated in around 1402, after the great struggles between Florence and Visconti-led Milan in the 1390s. He considered Petrarch's humanism to be a rhetorical, superficial project, and viewed this new strand to be one that abandoned the feudal and supposedly "otherworldly" (i.e., divine) ideology of the Middle Ages in favour of putting the republican state and its freedom at the forefront of the "civic humanist" project. Already controversial at the time of The Crisis' publication, the "Baron Thesis" has been met with even more criticism over the years.

Even in the 1960s, historians Philip Jones and Peter Herde found Baron's praise of "republican" humanists naive, arguing that republics were far less liberty-driven than Baron had believed, and were practically as undemocratic as monarchies. James Hankins adds that the disparity in political values between the humanists employed by oligarchies and those employed by princes was not particularly notable, as all of Baron's civic ideals were exemplified by humanists serving various types of government. In so arguing, he asserts that a "political reform program is central to the humanist movement founded by Petrarch. But it is not a 'republican' project in Baron's sense of republic; it is not an ideological product associated with a particular regime type."

=== Garin and Kristeller ===
Two renowned Renaissance scholars, Eugenio Garin and Paul Oskar Kristeller collaborated with one another throughout their careers. But while the two historians were on good terms, they fundamentally disagreed on the nature of Renaissance humanism.

- Kristeller affirmed that Renaissance humanism used to be viewed just as a project of Classical revival, one that led to great increase in Classical scholarship. But he argued that this theory "fails to explain the ideal of eloquence persistently set forth in the writings of the humanists," asserting that "their classical learning was incidental to" their being "professional rhetoricians." Similarly, he considered their influence on philosophy and particular figures' philosophical output to be incidental to their humanism, viewing grammar, rhetoric, poetry, history, and ethics to be the humanists' main concerns.
- Garin, on the other hand, viewed philosophy itself as being ever-evolving, each form of philosophy being inextricable from the practices of the thinkers of its period. He thus considered the Italian humanists' break from Scholasticism and newfound freedom to be perfectly in line with this broader sense of philosophy.

During the period in which they argued over these differing views, there was a broader cultural conversation happening regarding Humanism: one revolving around Jean-Paul Sartre and Martin Heidegger.

- In 1946, Sartre published a work called "L'existentialisme est un humanisme," in which he outlined his conception of existentialism as revolving around the belief that "existence comes before essence"; that man "first of all exists, encounters himself, surges up in the world – and defines himself afterwards," making himself and giving himself purpose.
- Heidegger, in a response to this work of Sartre's, declared: "For this is humanism: meditating and caring, that human beings be human and not inhumane, "inhuman", that is, outside their essence." He also discussed a decline in the concept of humanism, pronouncing that it had been dominated by metaphysics and essentially discounting it as philosophy. He also explicitly criticized Italian Renaissance humanism in the letter.

While this discourse was taking place outside the realm of Renaissance Studies (for more on the evolution of the term "humanism," see Humanism), this background debate was not irrelevant to Kristeller and Garin's ongoing disagreement. Kristeller—who had at one point studied under Heidegger—also discounted (Renaissance) humanism as philosophy, and Garin's Der italienische Humanismus was published alongside Heidegger's response to Sartre—a move that Rubini describes as an attempt "to stage a pre-emptive confrontation between historical humanism and philosophical neo-humanisms." Garin also conceived of the Renaissance humanists as occupying the same kind of "characteristic angst the existentialists attributed to men who had suddenly become conscious of their radical freedom," further weaving philosophy with Renaissance humanism.

Hankins summarizes the Kristeller v. Garin debate as:

- Kristeller conceives of professional philosophers as being very formal and method-focused. Renaissance humanists, on the other hand, he viewed to be professional rhetoricians who, using their classically-inspired paideia or institutio, did improve fields such as philosophy, but without the practice of philosophy being their main goal or function.
- Garin, instead, wanted his "humanist-philosophers to be organic intellectuals," not constituting a rigid school of thought, but having a shared outlook on life and education that broke with the medieval traditions that came before them.

=== I. R. Grigulevich ===
According to Russian historian and Stalinist assassin Iosif Grigulevich two characteristic traits of late Renaissance humanism were "its revolt against abstract, Aristotelian modes of thought and its concern with the problems of war, poverty, and social injustice."

== See also ==
- Christian humanism
- Greek scholars in the Renaissance
- Legal humanists
- List of Renaissance humanists
- New Learning
- Renaissance Latin
- Renaissance humanism in Northern Europe
- Symbolism of domes
