= Giovanni da Nono =

Paduan judge and writer

Giovanni da Nono (Latin: Iohannes de Nono; c. 1275 – 1346/1347) was a Paduan judge and writer.

== Life ==
Giovanni was born near Padua around 1275. He took his name from his ancestral village of Naone. His parents were Simone di Pasqualino and Paola Sottile and in his own writings he claims noble ancestry. Modern research has linked him to an impoverished branch of the Castelli family from the March of Treviso. At a date unknown, Giovanni married Dotta, daughter of Paolo Dotto de' Dauli. They had five children.

Giovanni joined the Paduan College of Judges on 20 August 1306. He is attested as a judge continuously from 1310 until 1346. He died 1346 or 1347.

== Works ==
Giovanni wrote three works about Padua in Latin between 1314 and 1337, collectively known as the Liber ludi Fortune (Book of the Fortune's game). The order in which they appear in manuscripts which carry all three is:

1. De aedificatione urbis Patavie (On the founding of the city of Padua)
2. Visio Egidii regis Patavie (Vision of Egidius king of Padua)
3. Liber de generatione aliquorum civium urbis Padue, tam nobilium, quam ignobilium (Book of the genealogy of some citizens of the town of Padua, both nobles and commoners)

De aedificatione is the shortest of the three. It describes how a mythical Paduan king named Dardanus defeated Tartarus, king of the Tartars. He then goes to fight in the Trojan War and is killed by Antenor, who founds Altino and refounds Padua after an earthquake.

The Visio Egidii belongs to the medieval genre of urban description. It is framed, however, as a prophetic vision of the legendary king Egidius in the time of Attila the Hun. It was written between 1314 and 1318. It describes, in succession, the gates, walls and secular buildings, ending with the town hall and the adjacent market squares. It does not mention any religious buildings.

De generatione is Giovanni's major work. It is divided into four books in the oldest manuscript, but this division is not followed in all copies. It gives overviews of both major and minor families of the region, beginning with the House of Este and other powerful families and ending with over a hundred families of the lowest (popolano) rank, among them the Scrovegni.

== Bibliography ==
- Hyde, J. K. (1966). "Italian Social Chronicles in the Middle Ages" (PDF). Bulletin of the John Rylands Library. 49 (1): 107–132. doi:10.7227/BJRL.49.1.6.
- Kohl, Benjamin G. (2010). "Giovanni da Nono [Iohannes de Nono]". In Graeme Dunphy (ed.). Encyclopedia of the Medieval Chronicle. Vol. 1: A–I. Leiden: Brill. pp. 710–711.
- Zabbia, Marino (2001). "Giovanni da Nono". Dizionario Biografico degli Italiani (in Italian). Vol. 56: Giovanni Di Crescenzio–Giulietti. Rome: Institute of the Italian Encyclopaedia. ISBN 978-88-12-00032-6.
