= Heraklion =

City in Crete, Greece

Heraklion Ηράκλειο
- Municipality
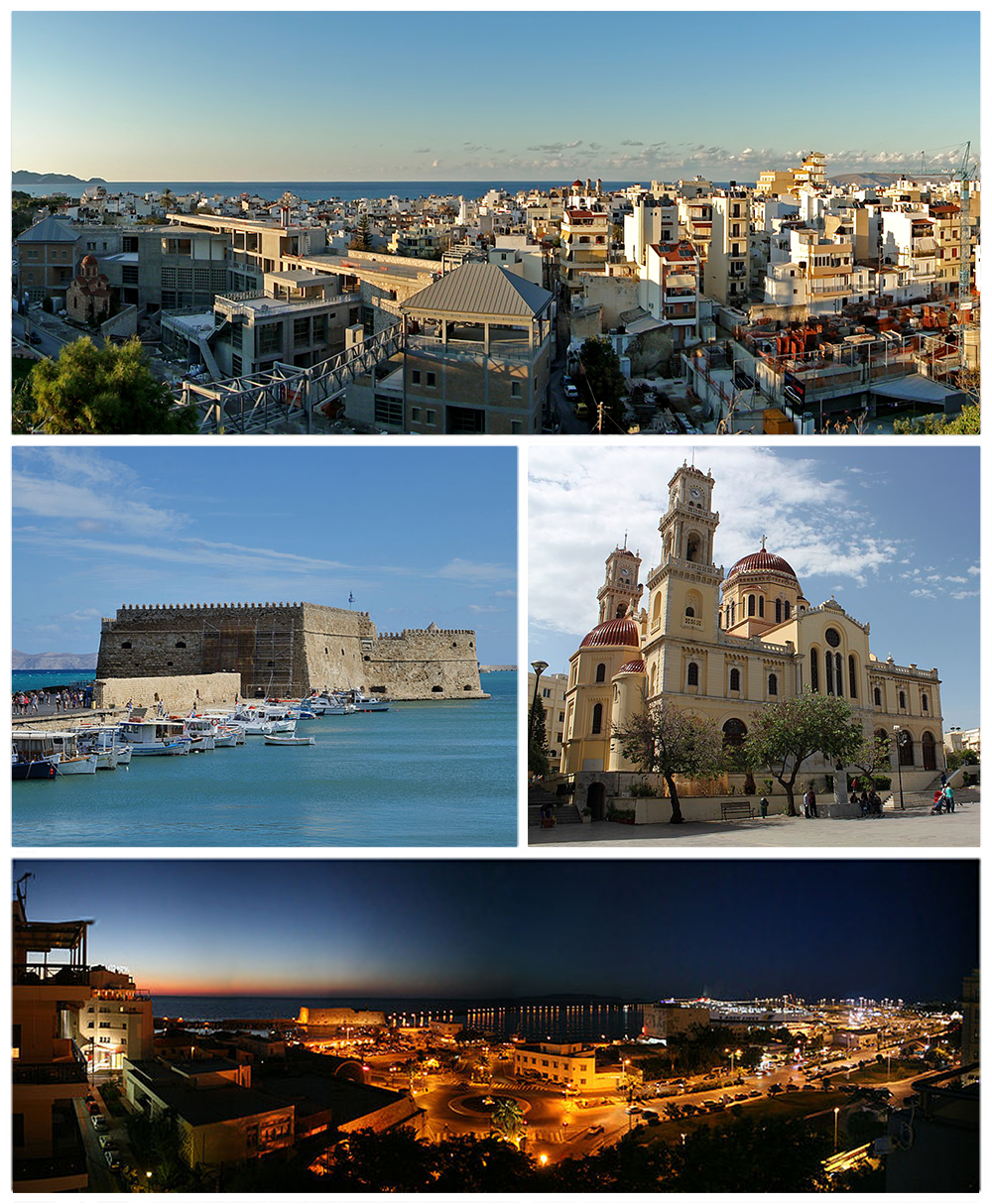
- Clockwise from top: Panoramic view of the city of Heraklion and the Sea of Crete, Agios Minas Cathedral, Night view of the Harbor of Heraklion, and Venetian fortress of Koules/Castello.

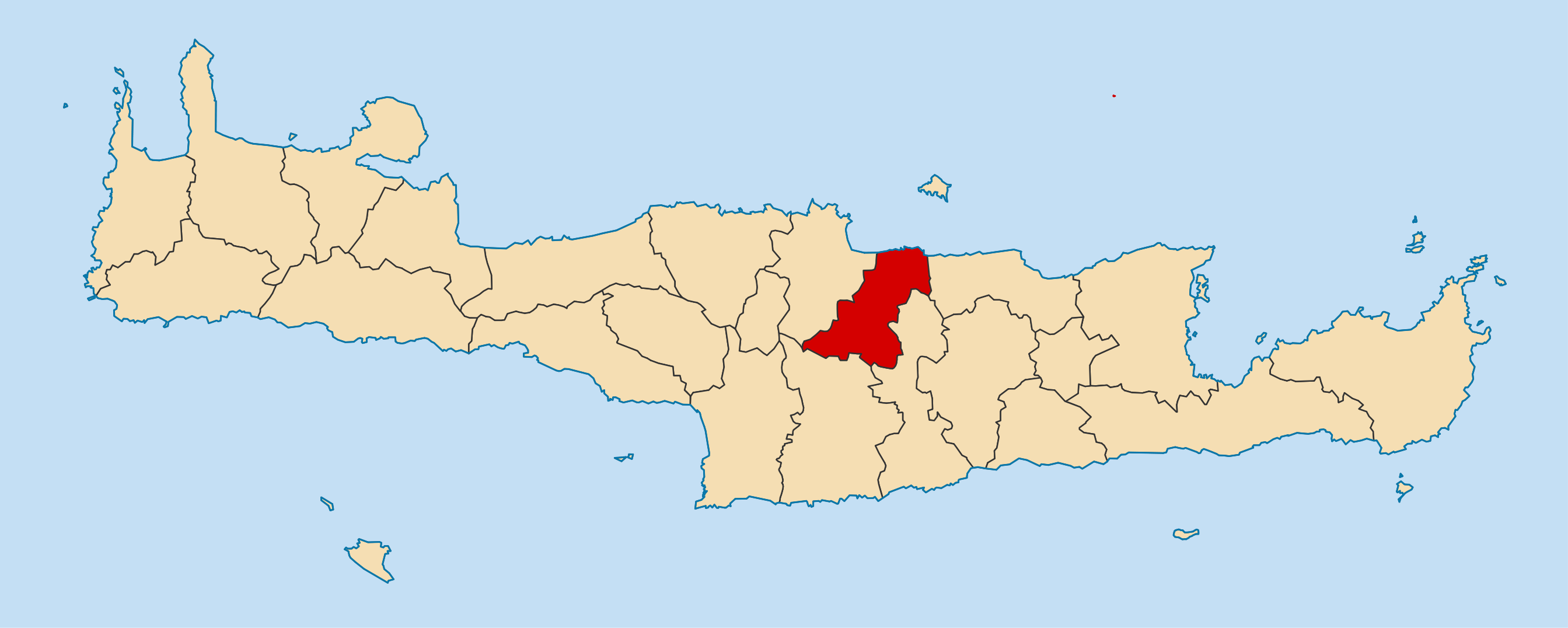

- Location within Greece
- Coordinates: 35°20′25″N 25°08′04″E
- Country: Greece
- Administrative region: Crete
- Regional unit: Heraklion

Government
  - Mayor: Alexis Kalokairinos (since 2023)

Area
  - Municipality: 244.6 km^{2} (94.4 sq mi)
  - Municipal unit: 109.0 km^{2} (42.1 sq mi)
- Highest elevation: 33 m (108 ft)
- Lowest elevation: 0 m (0 ft)

Population (2021)
  - Municipality: 179,302
  - Density: 733.0/km^{2} (1,899/sq mi)
  - Urban: 211,370
  - Municipal unit: 156,842
  - Municipal unit density: 1,439/km^{2} (3,727/sq mi)
- Demonym(s): Heraklian, Heraclian
- Time zone: UTC+2 (EET)
  - Summer (DST): UTC+3 (EEST)
- Postal code: 70x xx, 71x xx, 720 xx
- Area code: 281
- Vehicle registration: HK, HP, HZ
- Website: Heraklion-city.gr

Heraklion, Herakleion (/hɪˈrækliən/ hih-RAK-lee-ən; Greek: Ηράκλειο, Iráklio, pronounced [iˈrakli.o]) or Iraklion, is the largest city and the administrative capital of the island of Crete and capital of Heraklion regional unit. It is the fourth largest city in Greece, and the largest city in the Greek islands, with a municipal population of 179,302 (2021) and 211,370 in its wider metropolitan area, according to the 2011 census. The greater area of Heraklion has been continuously inhabited since at least 7000 BC, making it one of the oldest inhabited regions in Europe. It is also home to the ancient Knossos Palace, a major center of the Minoan civilization dating back to approximately 2000-1350 BC, often considered Europe's oldest city. The palace is one of the most significant archaeological sites in Greece, second only to the Parthenon in terms of visitor numbers.

Heraklion was Europe's fastest growing tourism destination for 2017, according to Euromonitor, with an 11.2% growth in international arrivals. According to the ranking, Heraklion was ranked as the 2nd most visited region in Greece, the 20th in Europe, and the 66th globally for the year 2017, with 3.2 million visitors and the 19th in Europe for 2018, with 3.4 million visitors.

== Etymology ==
The name Herakleion (Ηράκλειον) is derived from an ancient port of Heracleium that served as the harbour for Knossos. The port, bearing the same name, was named in honour of the hero Heracles (Hercules). In antiquity, it was located about 20 stadia (approximately 3.7 kilometers) from Knossos. Strabo also confirms the connection between the two.

The site of the ancient port falls within the boundaries of the modern city, near today’s port area. Although ecclesiastical records do not list it as a bishopric, a bishop named Theodoros of Heracleopolis is mentioned at the Second Council of Nicaea.

The name was revived in the 19th century and was in use by locals as early as 1867.

=== Other names ===
1. In antiquity: The area that would later become the city of Heraklion served as the port for the ancient city of Knossos, one of the centers of the Minoan civilization. This strategic location facilitated trade and communication across the Mediterranean. Over time, as Knossos declined, the port area grew in significance, eventually becoming a prominent urban center.

2. Rabḍ al-ḫandaq (ربض الخندق): In AD 824, Arab exiles from al-Andalus (Iberia) who conquered Crete and founded the Emirate of Crete moved the island's capital from Gortyna to a new castle they called rabḍ al-ḫandaq ("Castle of the Moat").

3. Chándax (Χάνδαξ) / Chándakas (Χάνδακας): The Arabic name rabḍ al-ḫandaq was Hellenized to Χάνδαξ (Chándax) or Χάνδακας (Chándakas).

4. Candia: This name, derived from Chándax, was Latinized as Candia and adopted into other European languages: in Italian and Latin as Candia, in Spanish as Candía, in French as Candie, and in English as Candy. These names could refer to the island of Crete as a whole as well as to the city alone; the Ottoman name for the city was Kandiye.

5. Megalo Kastro (Μεγάλο Κάστρο): After the Byzantine reconquest of Crete, the city was locally known as Megalo Kastro (Μεγάλο Κάστρο, 'Big Castle' in Greek) and its inhabitants were called Kastrinoi (Καστρινοί, "castle-dwellers").

== History ==
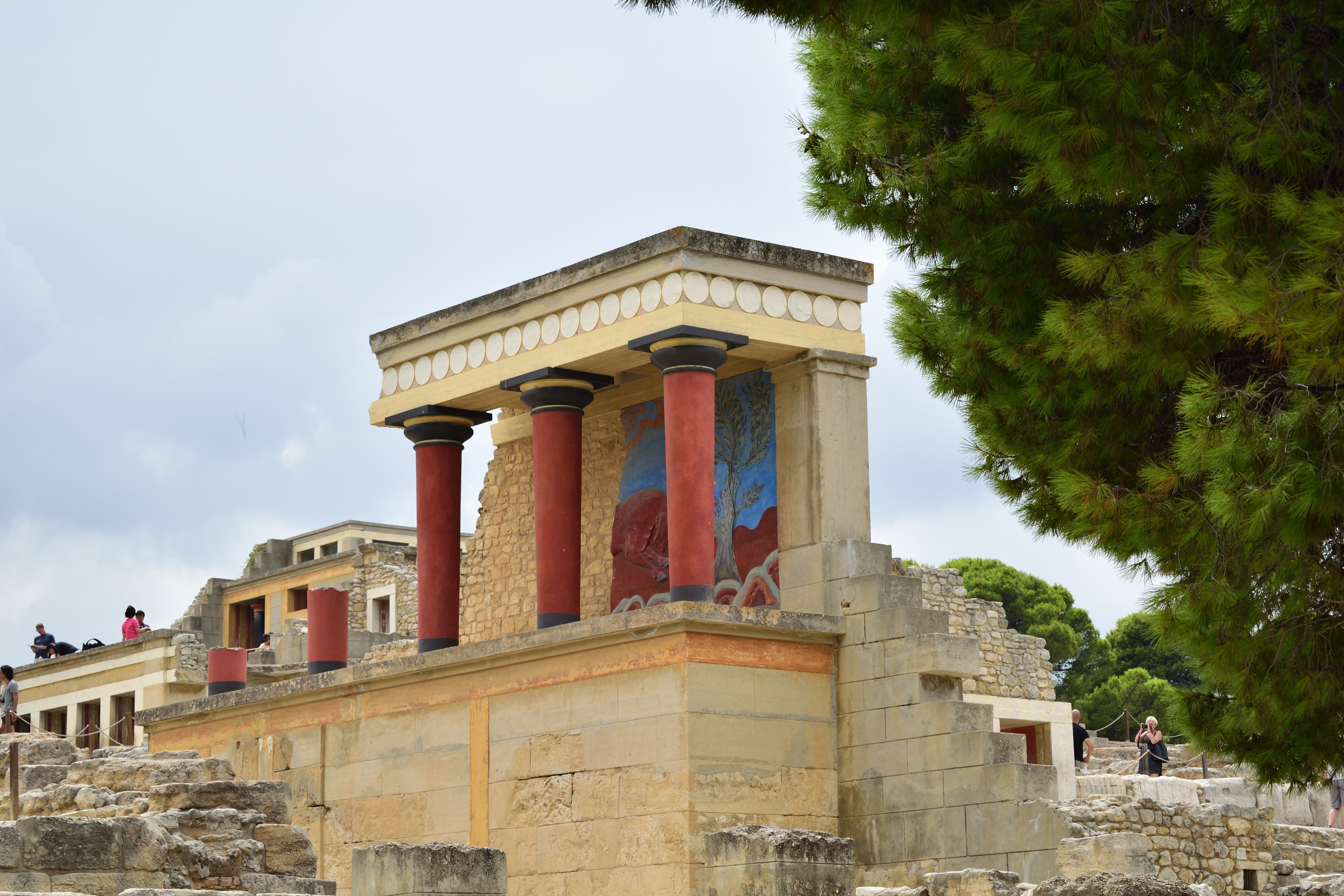
Knossos is located within the Municipality of Heraklion and has been called Europe's oldest city

=== Minoan era ===
Heraklion is home to the ruins of the palace of Knossos, located in the southern periphery of the city and part of the Heraklion municipality. In Minoan times, Knossos was the largest centre of population on Crete and is considered by many to be the oldest city in Europe.

Knossos itself had a port at the site of Heraklion (in the modern area of Poros-Katsambas neighborhood) from the beginning of the Early Minoan period (3500 to 2100 BC).

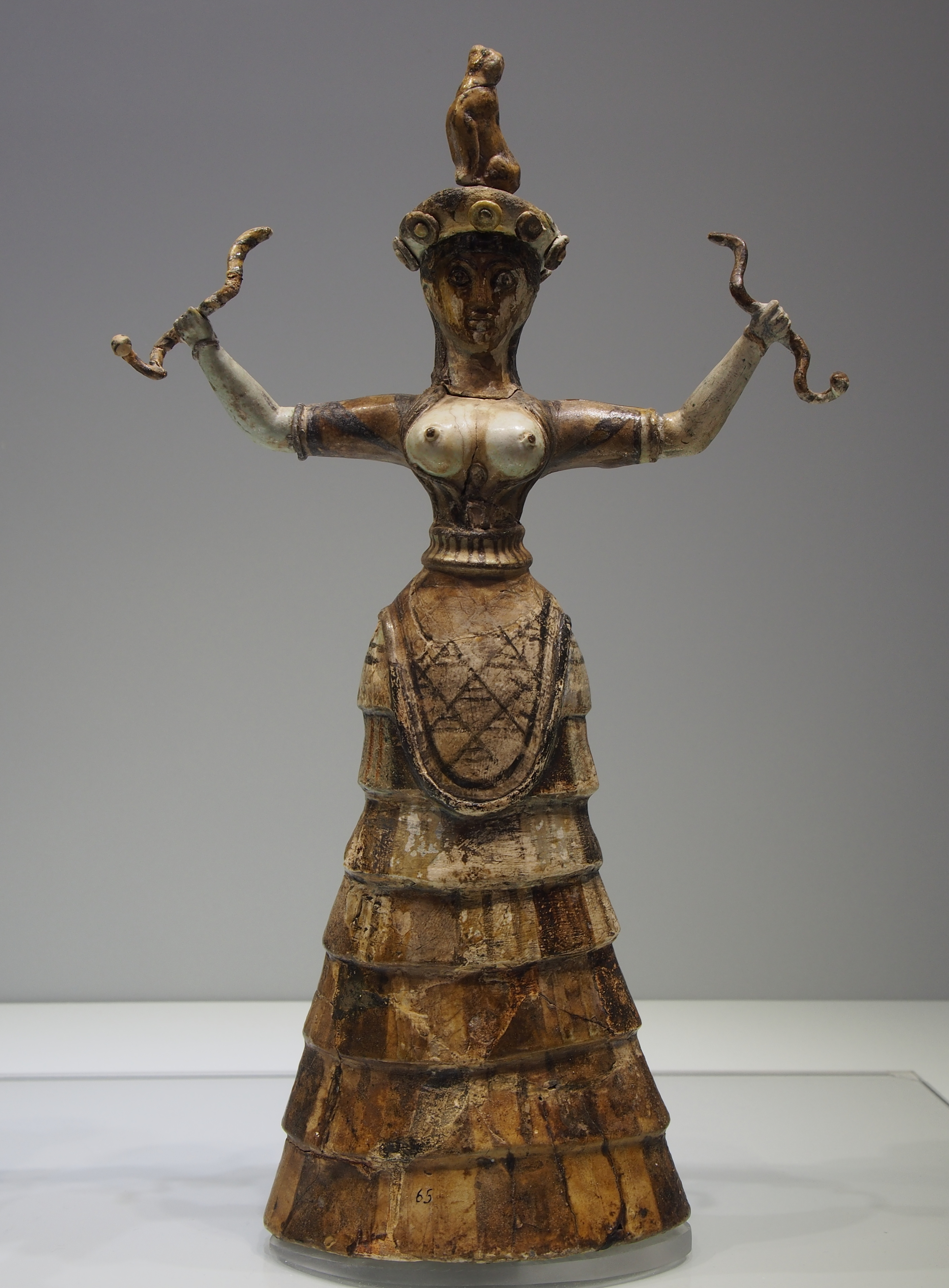
The snake goddess (c.1600 BC) in Heraklion Archaeological Museum

=== Antiquity ===
After the fall of the Minoans, Heraklion, as well as the rest of Crete in general, fared poorly, with very little development in the area. Only with the arrival of the Romans did some construction in the area begin, yet especially early into Byzantine times the area abounded with pirates and bandits.

=== Emirate of Crete ===
Heraklion was chosen as capital in 824, with fortifications starting being built the following year, by the Moors under Abu Hafs Umar who had been expelled from Al-Andalus by Emir Al-Hakam I and had taken over the island from the Eastern Roman Empire. They built a moat around the city for protection, and named the city rabḍ al-ḫandaq (ربض الخندق, "Castle of the Moat", hellenized as Χάνδαξ, Chandax). It became the capital of the Emirate of Crete (c. 827–961). The Saracens allowed the port to be used as a safe haven for pirates who operated against Imperial (Byzantine) shipping and raided Imperial territory around the Aegean.

=== Byzantine era ===
In 960, Byzantine forces under the command of Nikephoros Phokas, later to become Emperor, landed in Crete and attacked the city. After a prolonged siege, the city fell in March 961. The Saracen inhabitants were slaughtered, the city looted and burned to the ground. Soon rebuilt, the town remained under Byzantine control for the next 243 years.

=== Venetian era ===
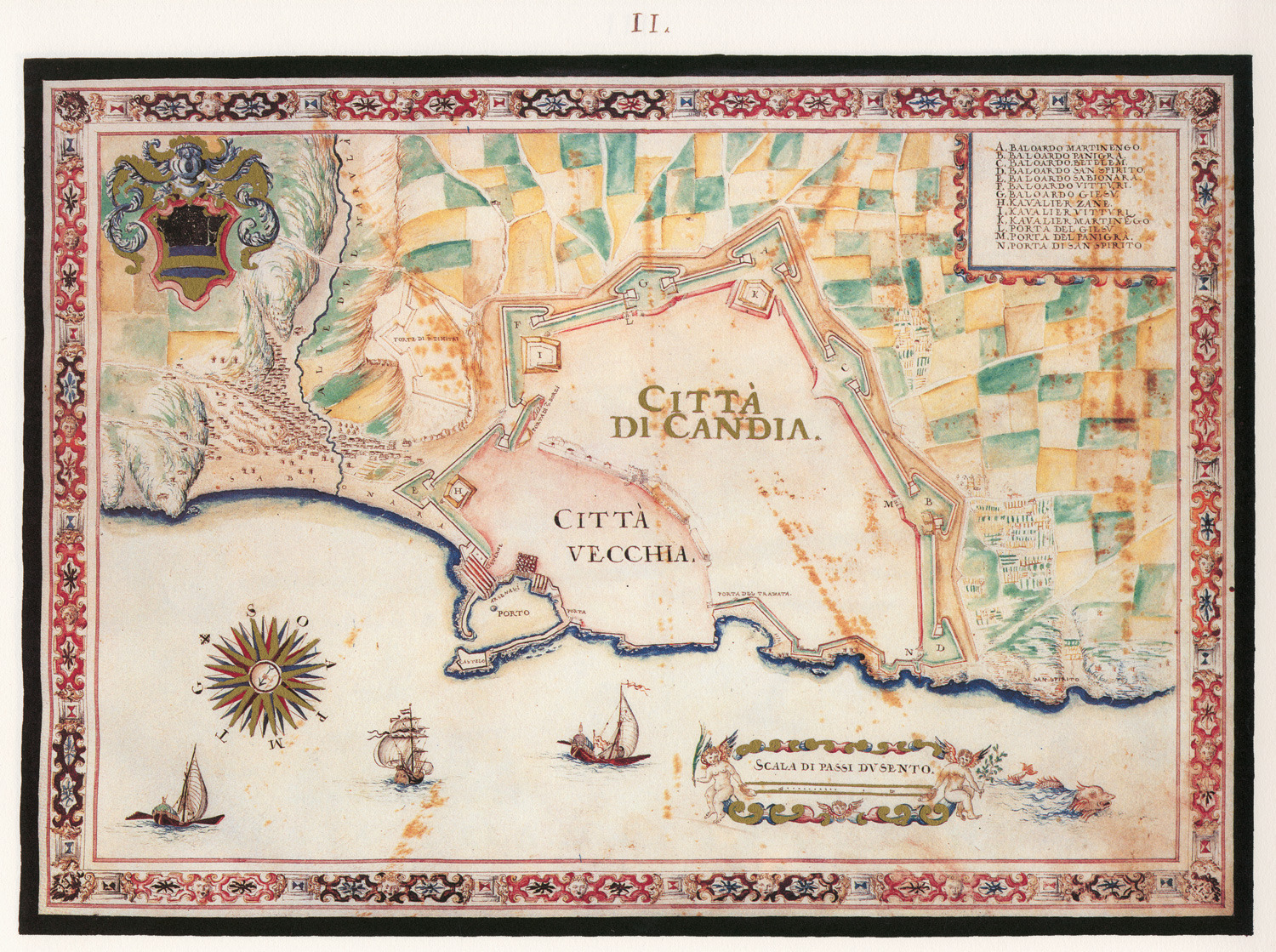
Representation of the city of Candia and the surrounding area by Francesco Basilicata, 1618

In 1204, the city was bought by the Republic of Venice as part of a complicated political deal which involved, among other things, the Crusaders of the Fourth Crusade restoring the deposed Eastern Roman Emperor Isaac II Angelus to his throne. The Venetians improved on the ditch of the city by building enormous fortifications, most of which are still in place, including a giant wall, in places up to 40 metres (130 ft) thick, with seven bastions, and a fortress in the harbour. Chandax was renamed Candia and became the seat of the Duke of Candia, and the Venetian administrative district of Crete became known as "Regno di Candia" (Kingdom of Candia). The city retained the name of Candia for centuries and the same name was often used to refer to the whole island of Crete as well. To secure their rule, the Venetians began in 1212 to settle families from Venice on Crete. The coexistence of two different cultures and the stimulus of the Italian Renaissance led to a flourishing of letters and the arts in Candia and Crete in general, that is today known as the Cretan Renaissance.

=== Ottoman era ===
During the Cretan War (1645–1669), the Ottomans besieged the city for 21 years, from 1648 to 1669, the longest siege in history up until that time. In its final phase, which lasted for 22 months, 70,000 Turks, 38,000 Cretans and slaves and 29,088 of the city's Christian defenders perished. The Ottoman army under an Albanian grand vizier, Köprülüzade Fazıl Ahmed Pasha, conquered the city in 1669.

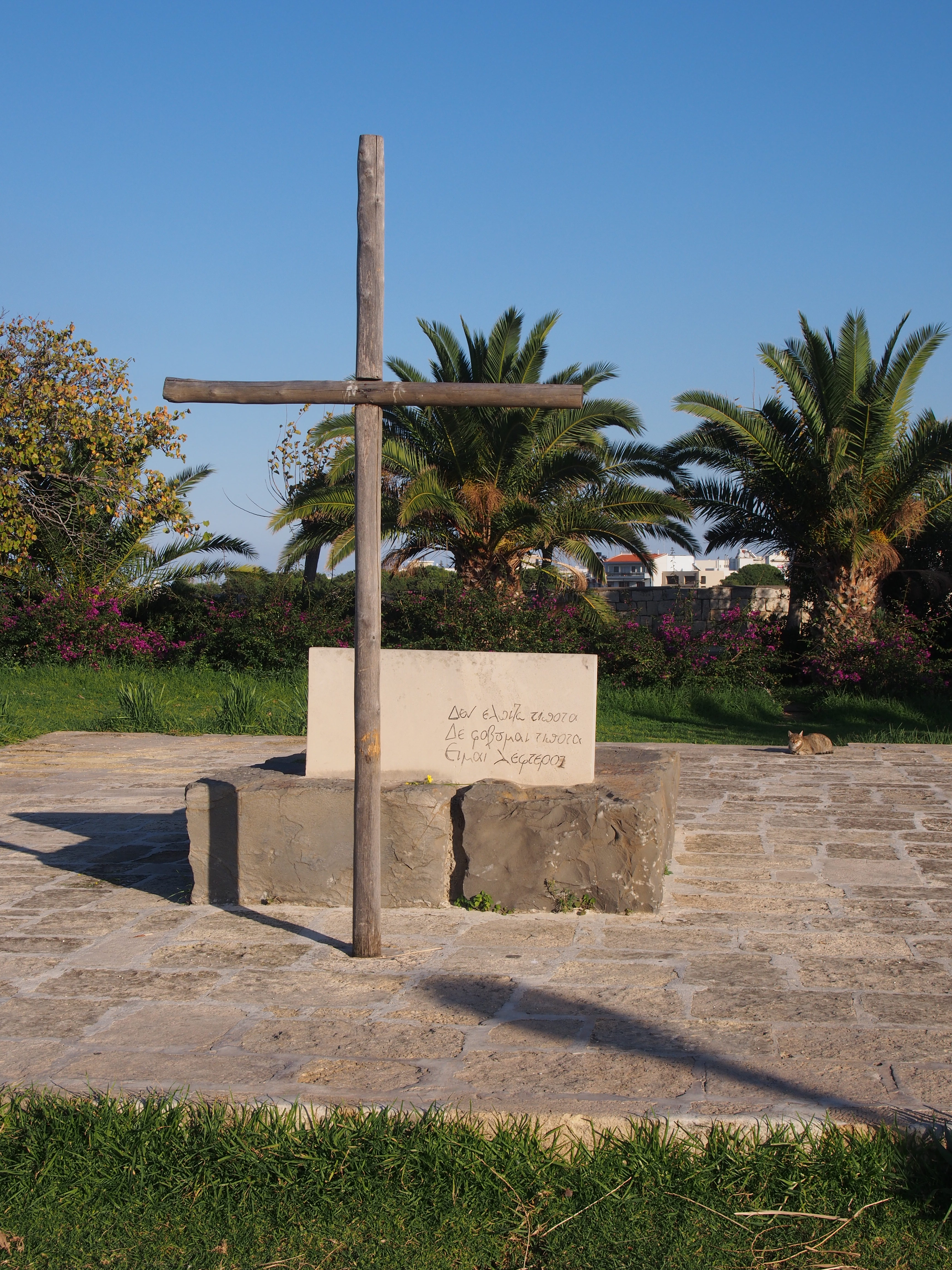
The tomb of Nikos Kazantzakis in the Martinengo bastion

Under the Ottomans, Kandiye (Ottoman Turkish قنديه) was the capital of Crete (Girit Eyâleti) until 1849, when Chania (Hanya) became the capital, and Kandiye became a sancak. In Greek, it was commonly called Megalo Castro (Μεγάλο Κάστρο 'Big Castle').

During the Ottoman period, the harbour silted up, so most shipping shifted to Chania in the west of the island.

=== Modern era ===
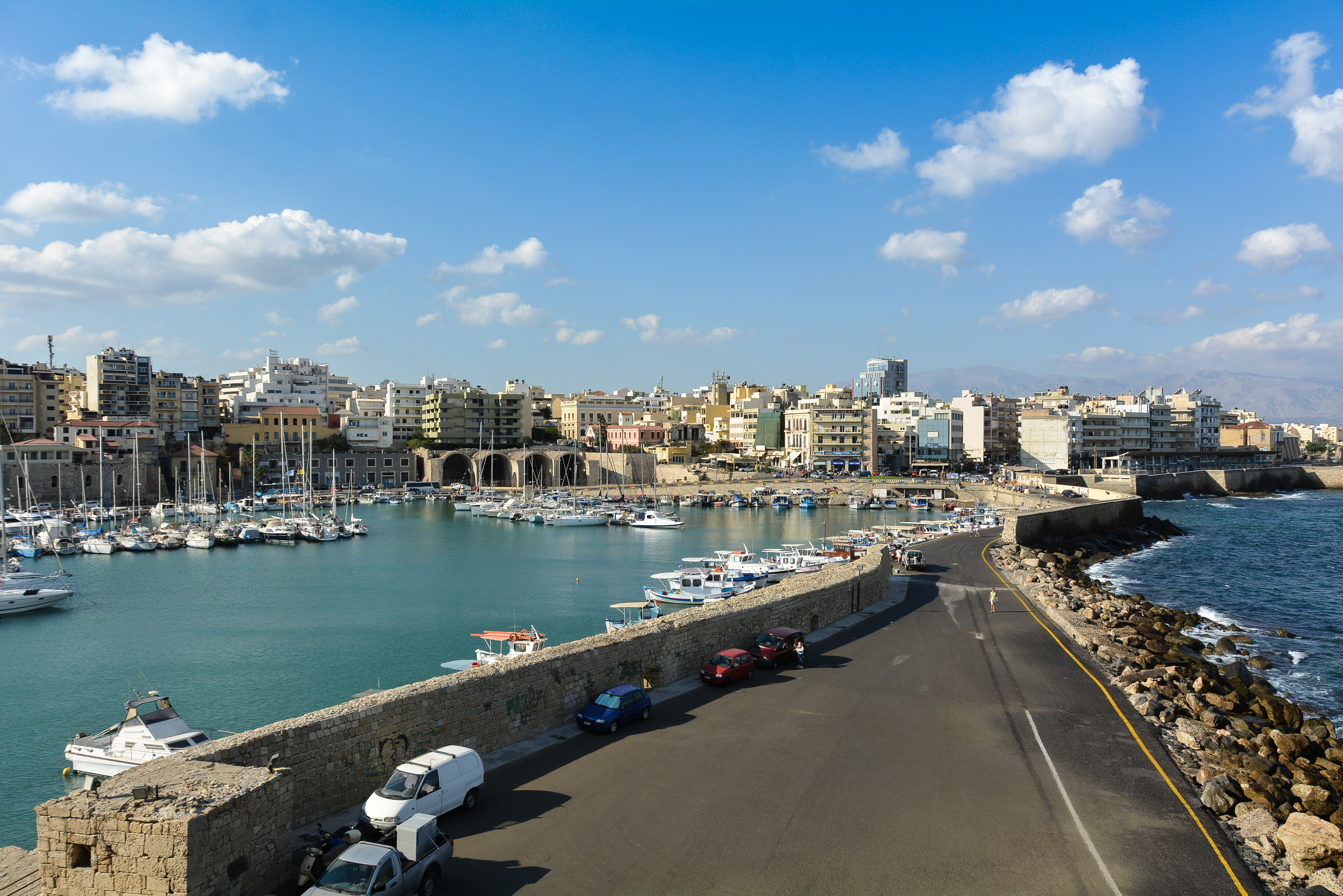
Panoramic view of the port of Heraklion from Koules Fortress

An earthquake located off the northern coast of Crete on October 12, 1856, destroyed most of the over 3,600 homes in the city. Only 18 homes were left intact. The disaster claimed 538 victims in Heraklion.

In 1898, the autonomous Cretan State was created, under Ottoman suzerainty, with Prince George of Greece as its High Commissioner and under international supervision. During the period of direct occupation of the island by the Great Powers (1898–1908), Candia was part of the British zone. At this time the ancient name of "Heraklion" was revived.

In 1913, with the rest of Crete, Heraklion was incorporated into the Kingdom of Greece. Heraklion was severely damaged in the bombing campaign in May 1941 during the German invasion in the Battle of Crete. The city remained under German rule until 1945. Heraklion again became capital of Crete in 1971, replacing Chania. The city, and Crete generally, became a major tourist destination from the 1980s onwards.

== Architecture, urban sculpture and fortifications ==
The oldest monument of architecture is the palace in Knossos on the outskirts of the city. The two largest medieval churches in the city were the Dominican church of St. Peter (built between 1248 and 1253) and the San Salvatore, belonging to the Augustinian Friars. The latter one stood in Kornaros Square, but was demolished in 1970. Other monuments of architecture from Venetian times include the Saint Mark's Basilica and the Renaissance loggia next to Lions Square (1626–28).

Around the historic city center of Heraklion there are also a series of defensive walls, bastions and other fortifications which were built earlier in the Middle Ages, but were completely rebuilt by the Republic of Venice. The fortifications managed to withstand the longest siege in history for 21 years, before the city fell to the Ottomans in 1669. The Koules Fortress (Castello a Mare), the ramparts and the arsenal dominate the port area. Many fountains of the Venetian era are preserved, such as the Bembo fountain, the Priuli fountain, Palmeti fountain, Sagredo fountain and Morosini fountain in Lions Square (1628).

Architecture from the 19th century is represented by the St Titus Cathedral, built in 1869 as the Yeni Cami ("New Mosque"), and the Agios Minas Cathedral (1862–95). An example of modern architecture in Heraklion is the Heraklion Archaeological Museum built between 1937 and 1940 by architect Patroklos Karantinos. Several sculptures, statues and busts commemorating significant events and figures of the city's and island's history, like El Greco, Vitsentzos Kornaros, Nikos Kazantzakis and Eleftherios Venizelos can be found around the city.

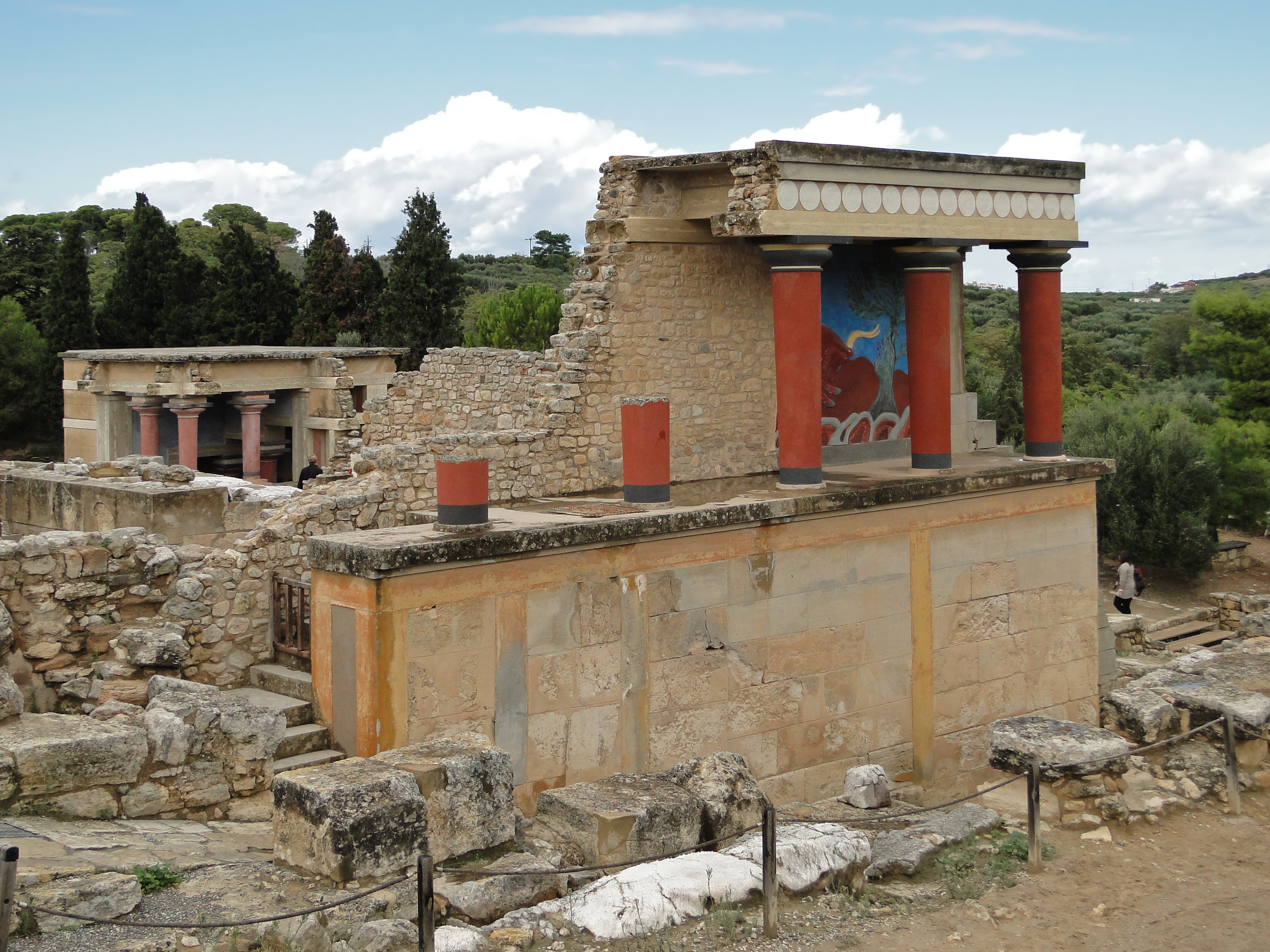
Knossos Palace

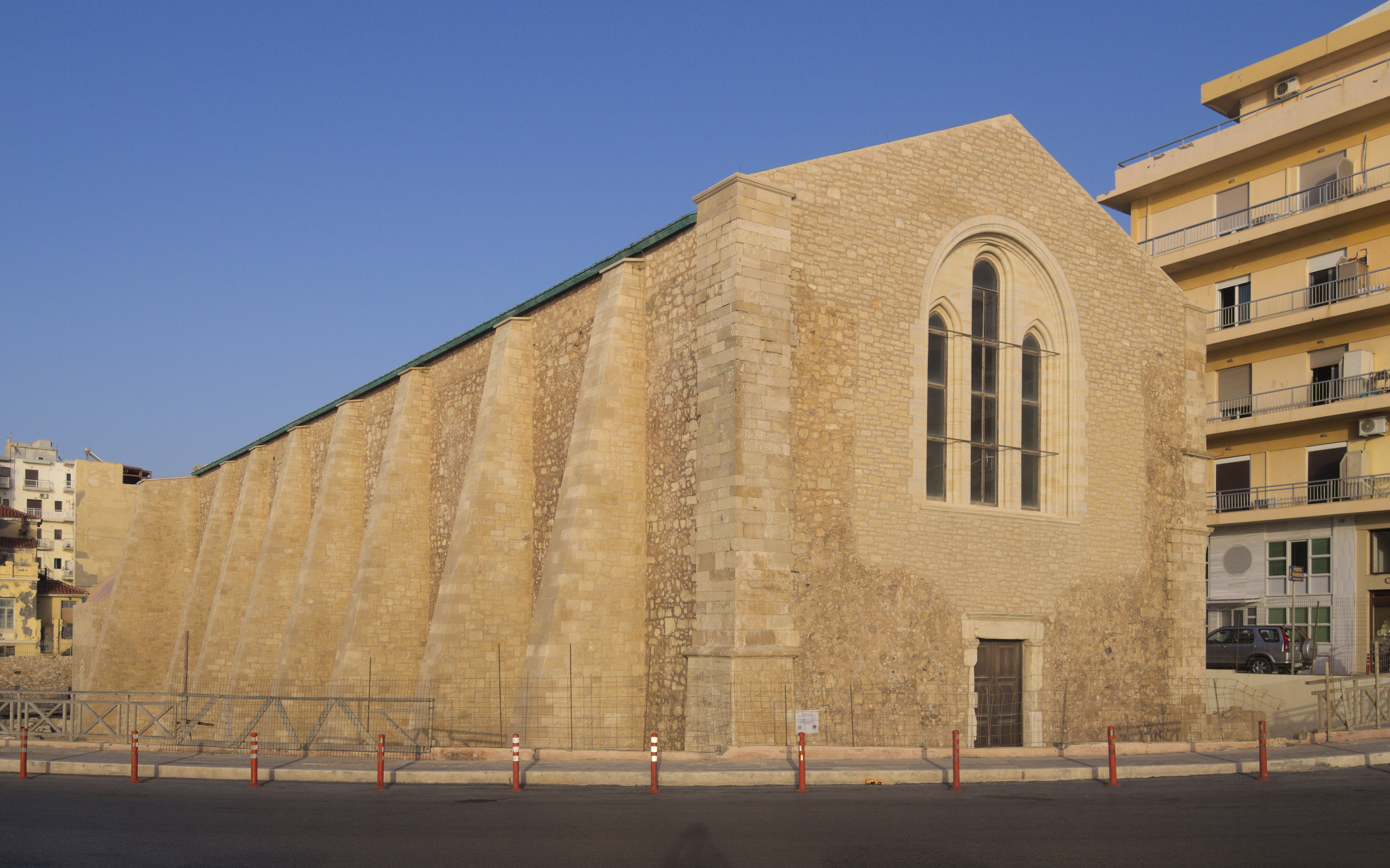
Dominican church of St. Peter

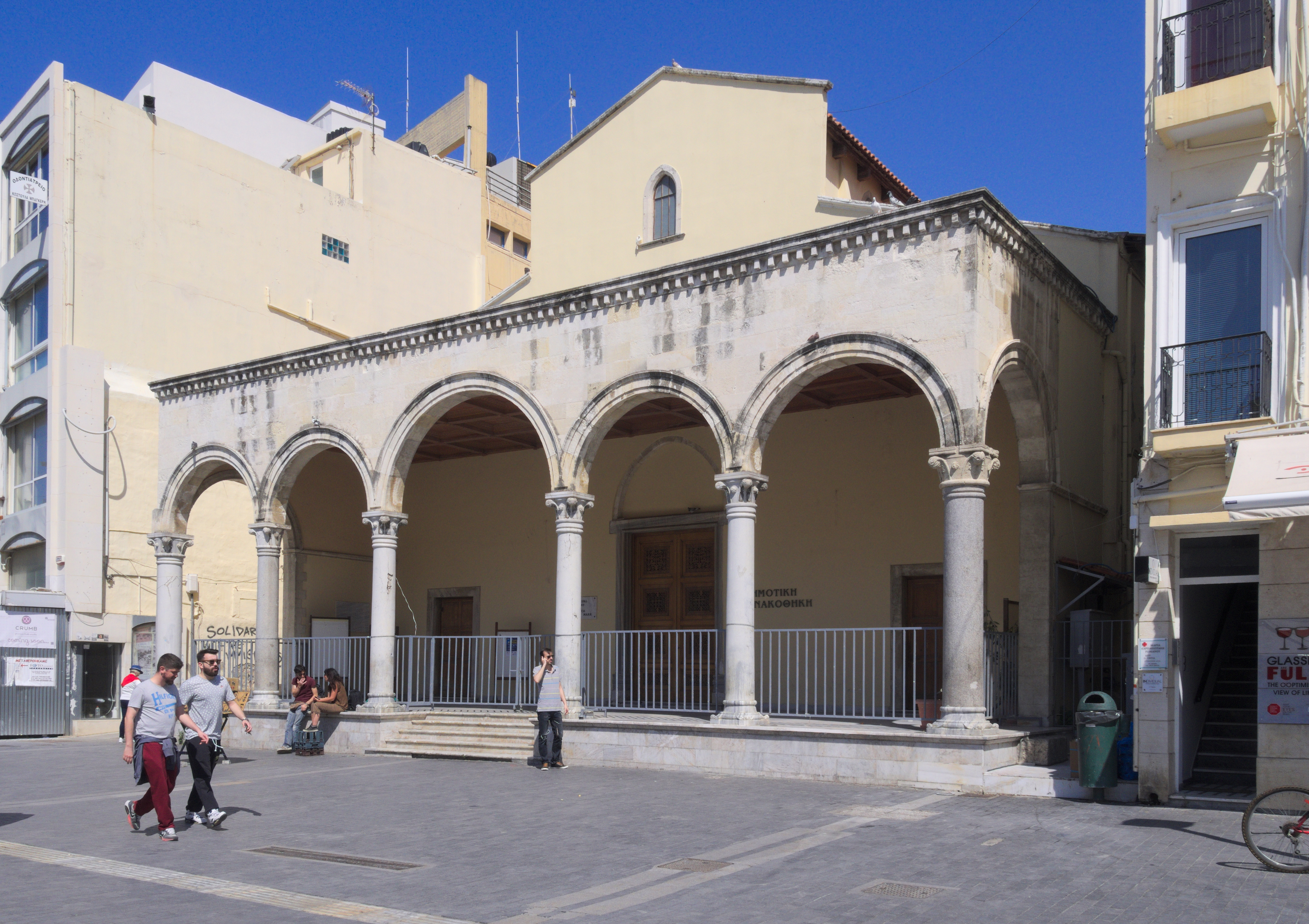
Saint Mark's basilica

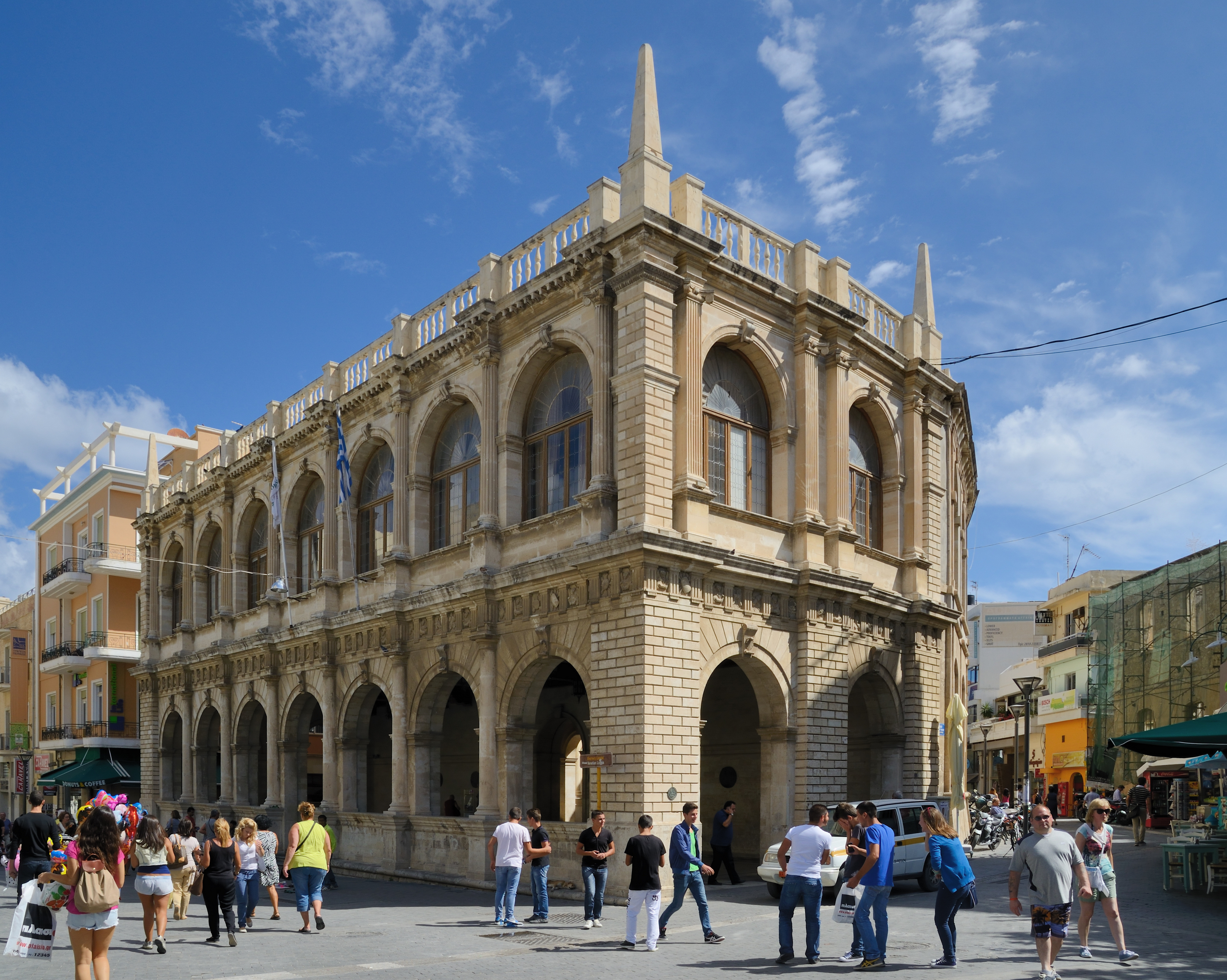
Venetian Loggia

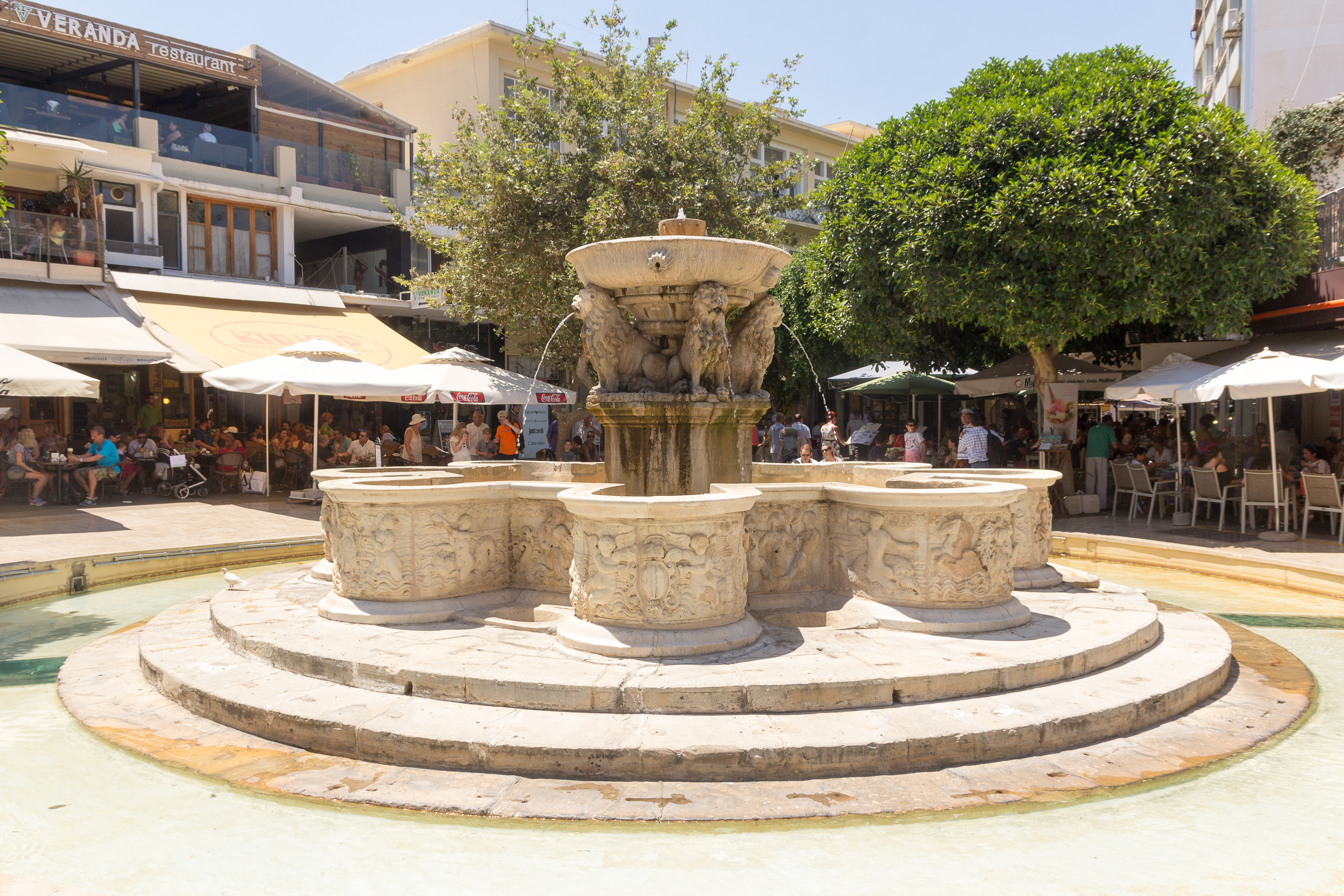
Morosini fountain in Lions Square

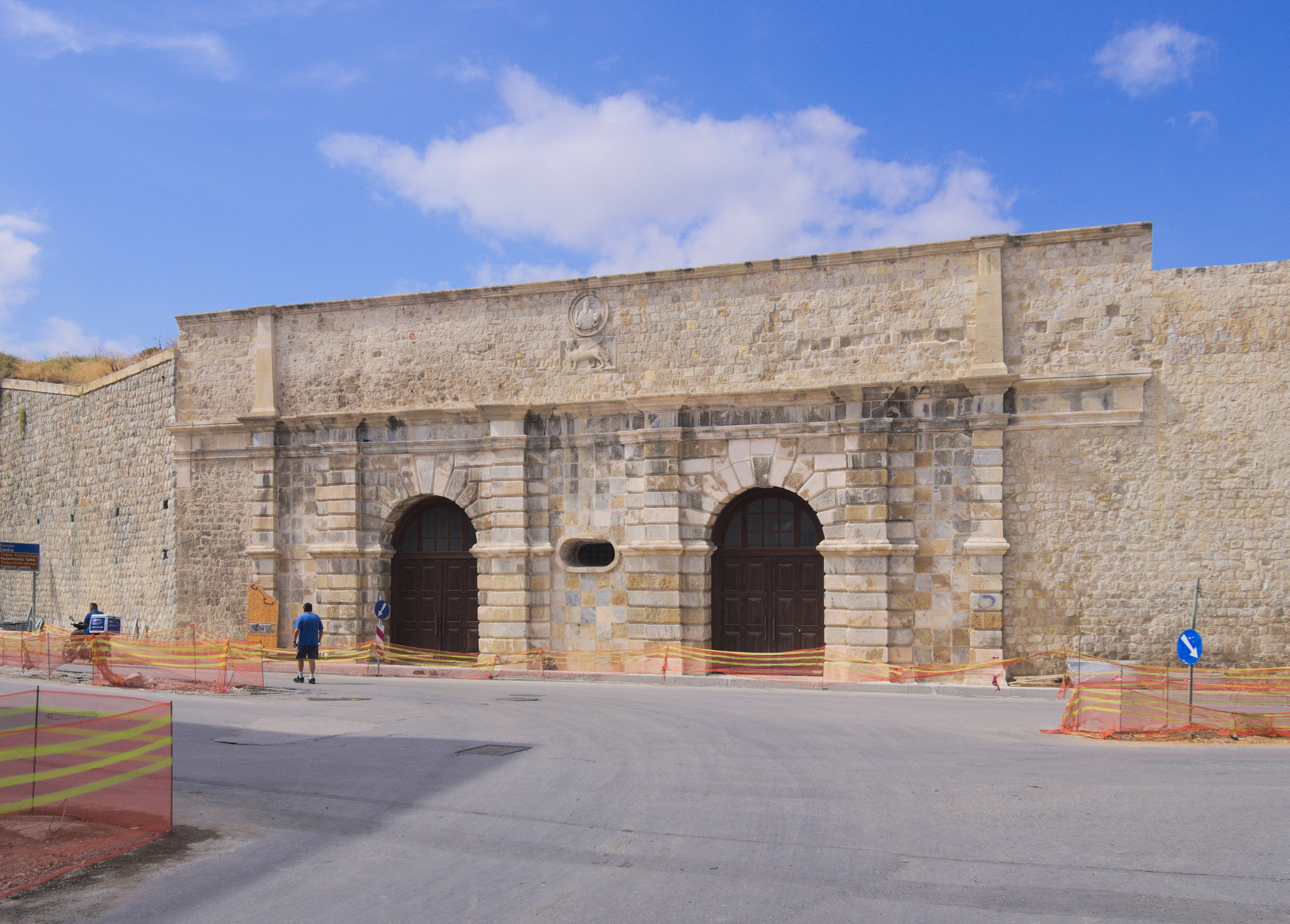
Venetian walls, Pantokratoras Gate

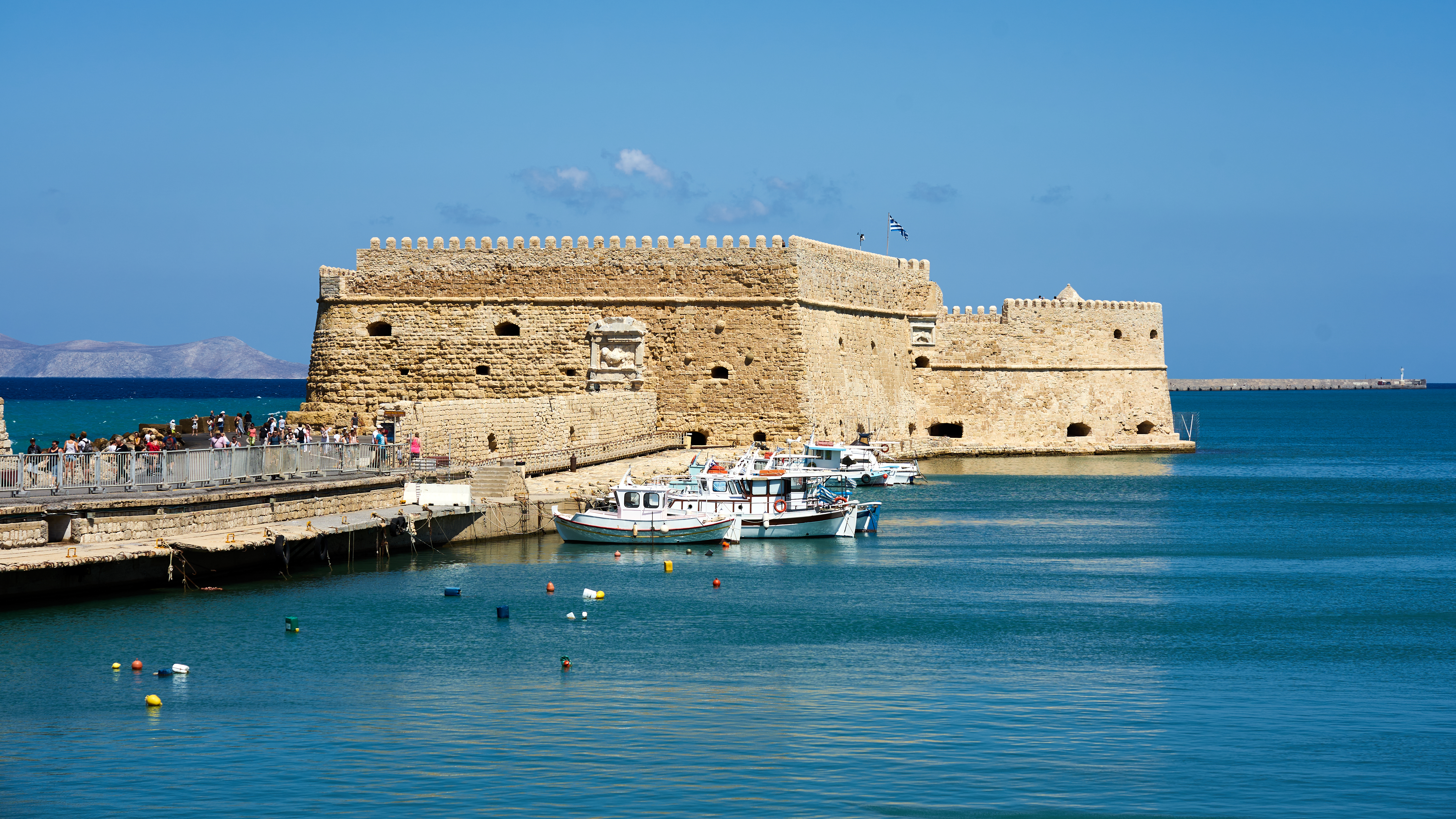
Koules Fortress

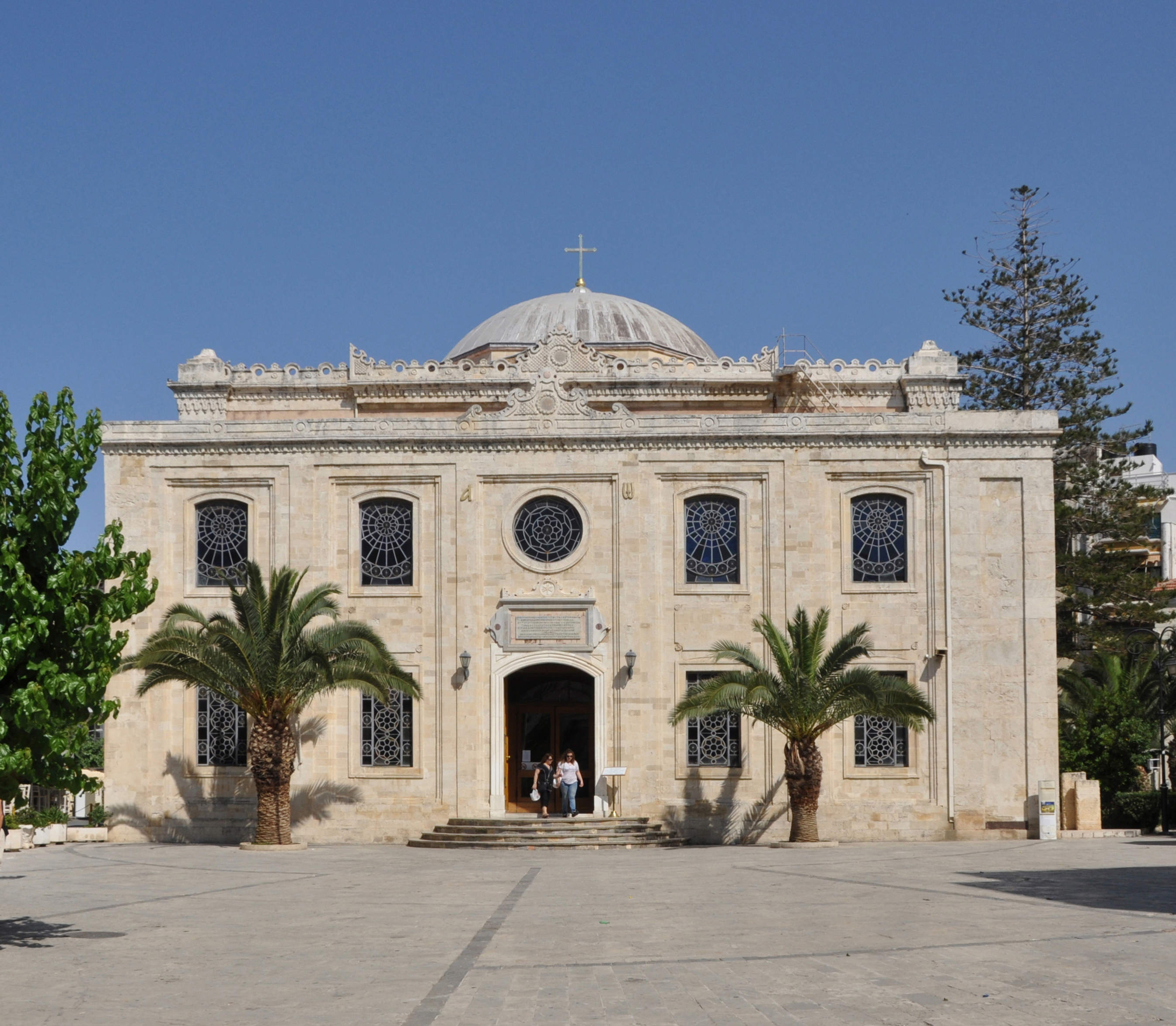
Saint Titus Cathedral

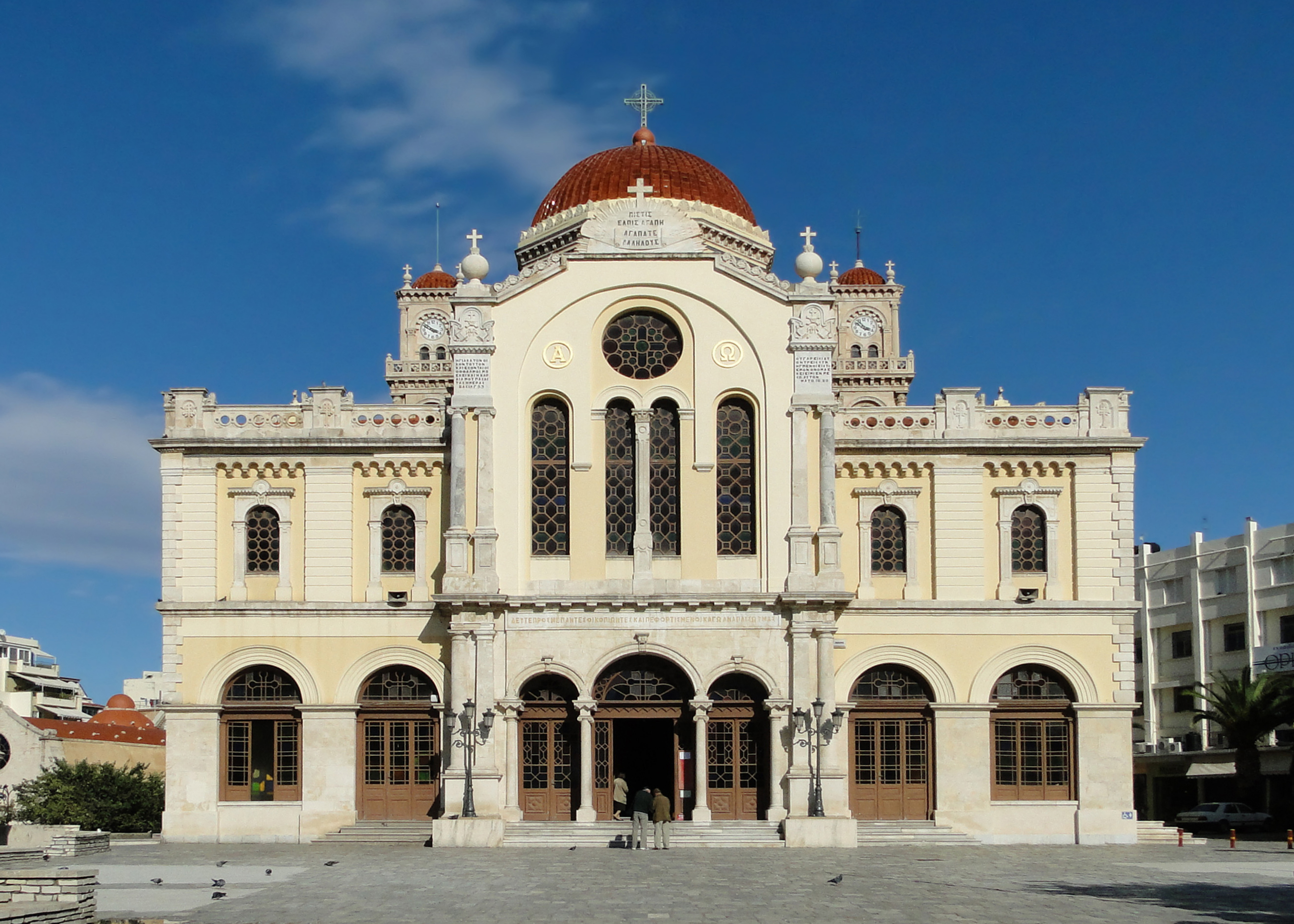
Agios Minas Cathedral

== Municipality ==
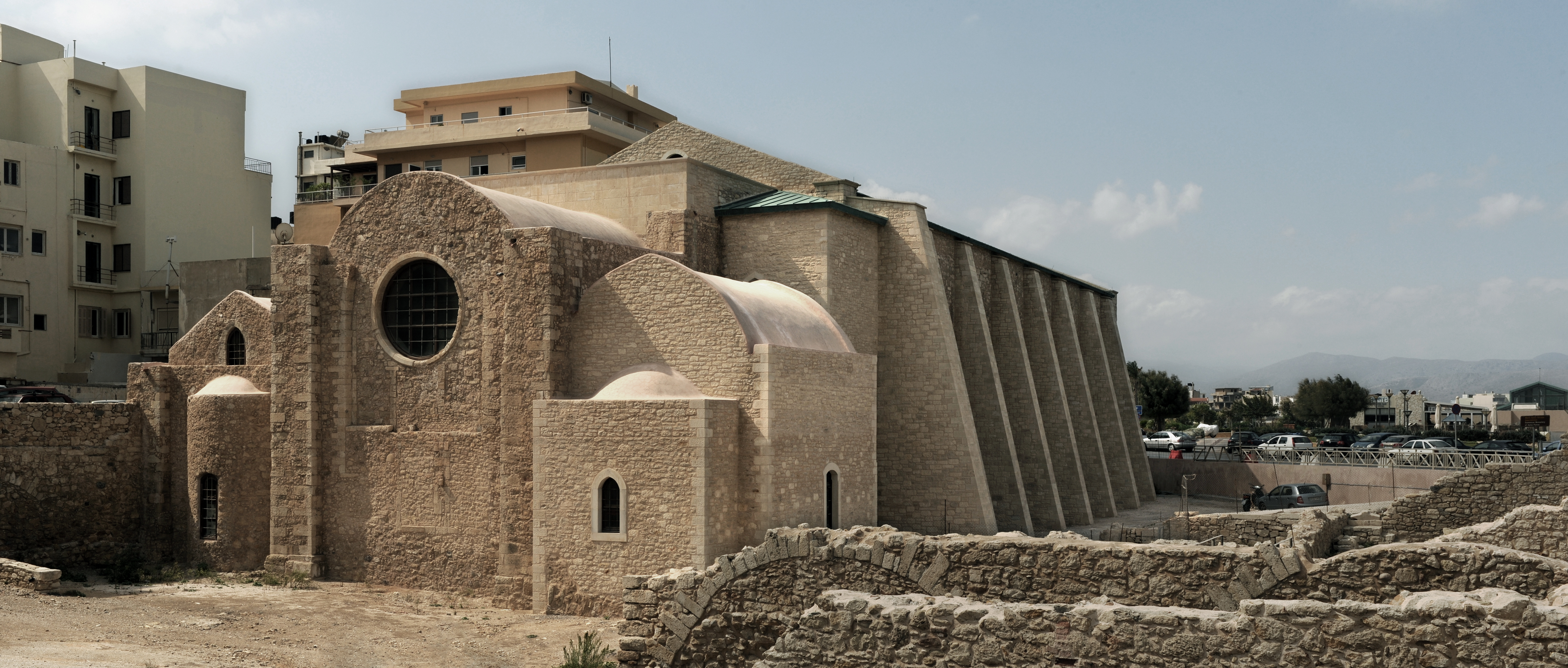
The Saint Peter of Dominicans, one of the oldest monuments of architecture of the Cistercian monks in the 12th century.

The municipality Heraklion was formed at the 2011 local government reform by the merger of the following 5 former municipalities, that became municipal units:

- Gorgolainis
- Heraklion
- Nea Alikarnassos
- Paliani
- Temenos

The municipality has an area of 244.613 km^{2}, the municipal unit 109.026 km^{2}.

== Neighborhoods ==
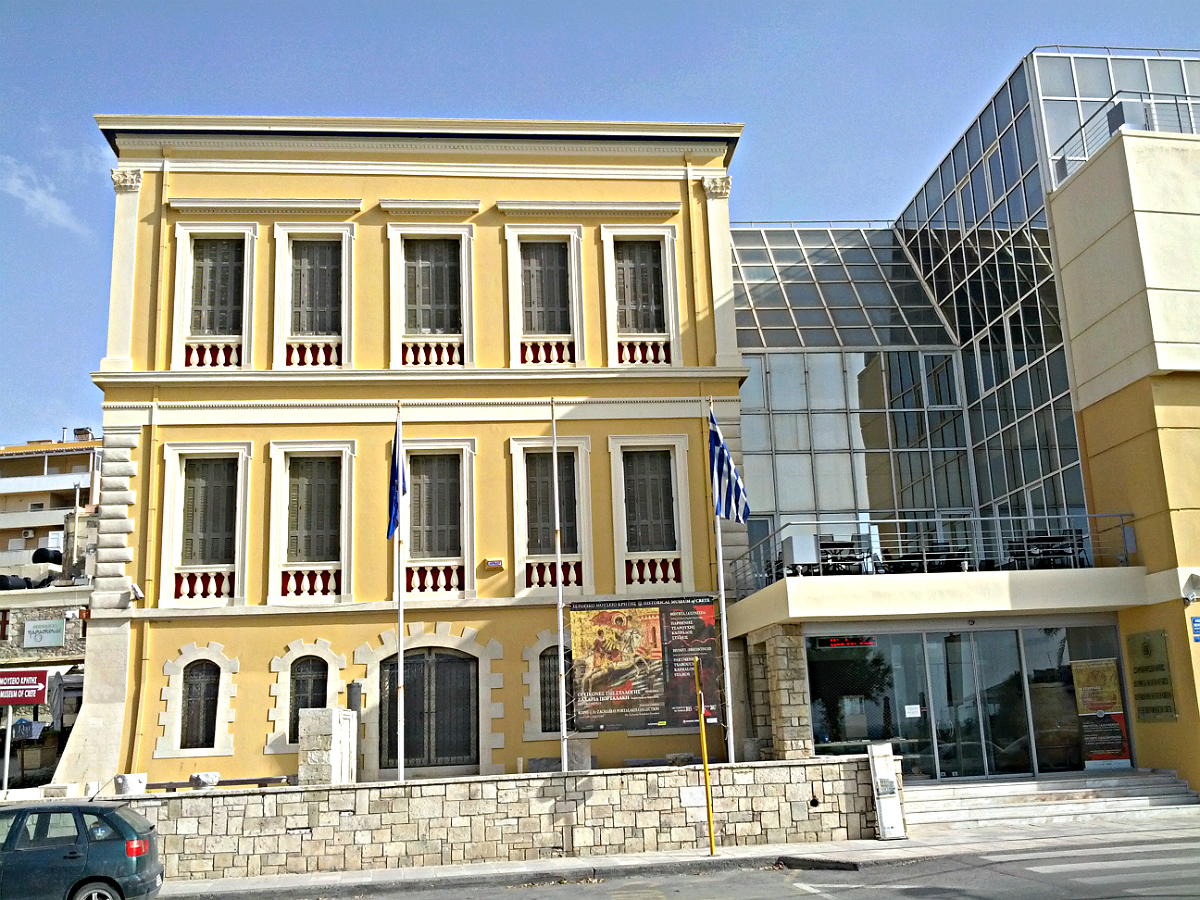
Historical Museum of Crete

• Agia Ekaterini	• Dimokratias	• Marathitis
• Agia Erini Chrisovalantou	• Estavromenos	• Mastabas
• Agia Marina	• Filothei	• Mesabelies
• Agia Triada	• Fortetsa	• Mpentevi
• Agios Dimitrios	• Ilioupoli	• Nea Alatsata
• Agios Ioannis Chostos	• Kamaraki	• Pananio
• Agios Minas	• Kaminia	• Papatitou Metochi
• Agios Titos	• Katsampas	• Pateles
• Akadimia	• Kenouria Porta	• Poros
• Ampelokipoi	• Kipoupoli	• Therissos
• Analipsi	• Komeno Mpenteni	• Tris Vagies
• Atsalenio	• Korakovouni	• Xiropotamos
• Chanioporta	• Koroni Magara	
• Chrisopigi	• Knossos	
• Dilina	• Lido	

== Suburbs ==
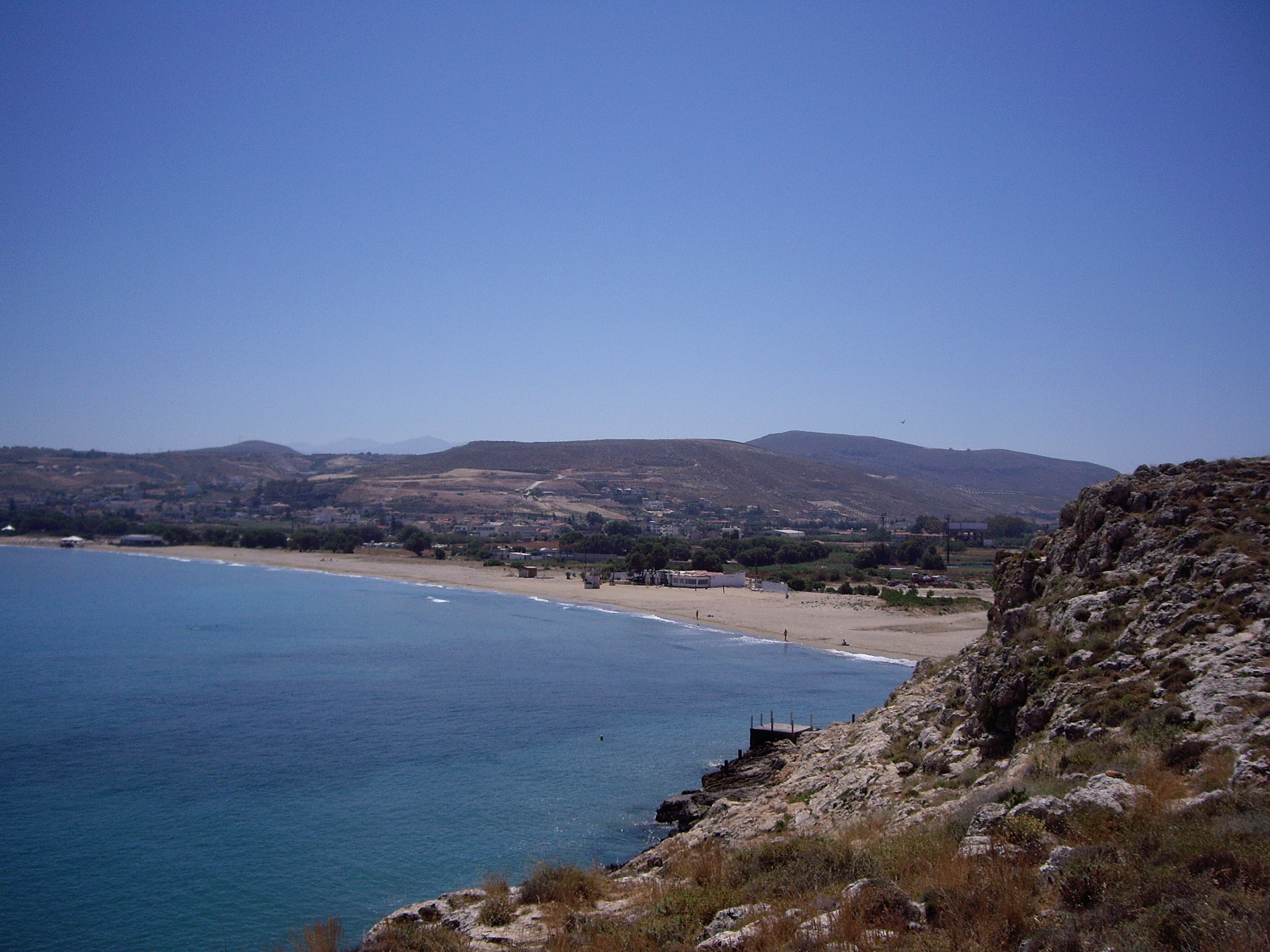
A panoramic view of Amnissos

• Agia Erini	• Finikia	• Ksirokabos
• Agia Marina	• Gazi urban area	• Malades
• Agioi Theodoroi	• Giofyrakia	• Nea Alikarnassos urban area
• Agios Syllas	• Gournes Temenous	• Sillamos
• Ammoudara	• Kallithea	• Skafidaras
• Amnisos	• Karteros	• Skalani
• Ano Kalesia	• Kato Kalesia	• Vasilies
• Athanati	• Kavrochori	• Voutes
• Dafnes	• Kollyvas	

== Transportation ==
=== Port ===
Heraklion is an important shipping port and ferry dock. Travellers can take ferries and boats from Heraklion to destinations including Santorini, Ios Island, Paros, Mykonos, and Rhodes. There are direct ferries to Naxos, Karpathos, Kasos, Sitia, Anafi, Chalki and Diafani. There are also several daily ferries to Piraeus, the port of Athens in mainland Greece. The port of Heraklion was built by Sir Robert McAlpine and completed in 1928.

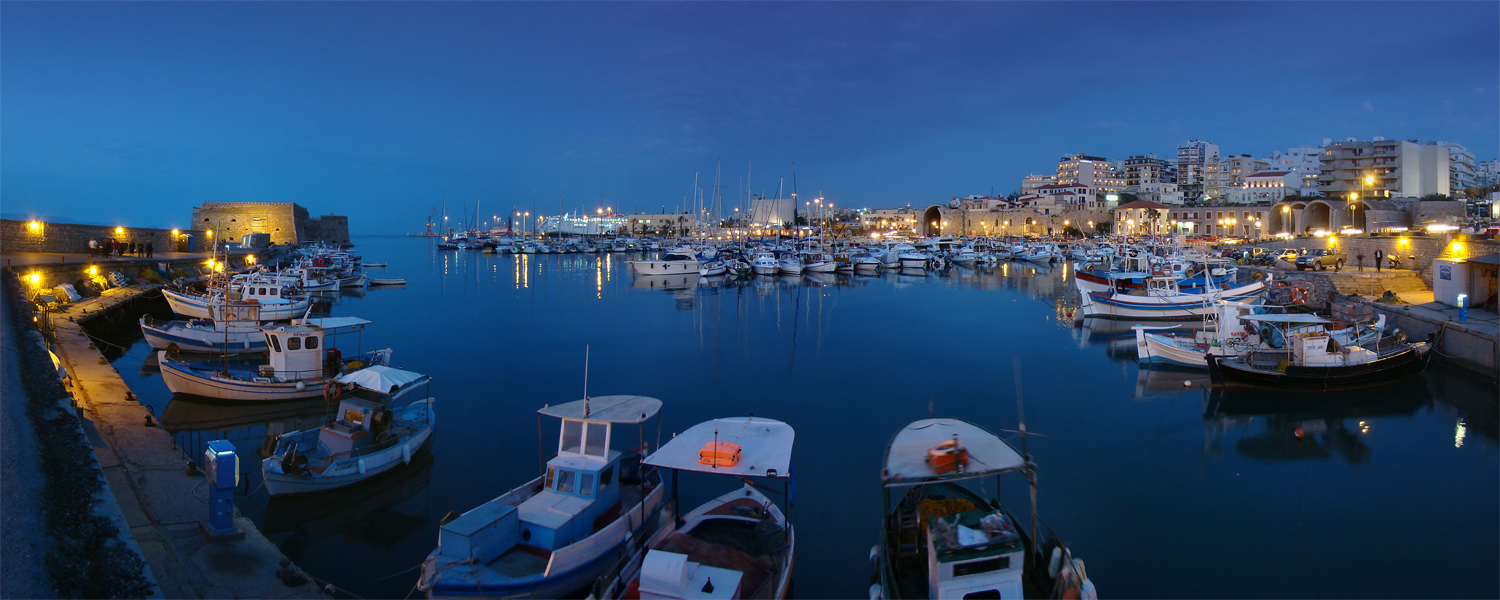

=== Airport ===
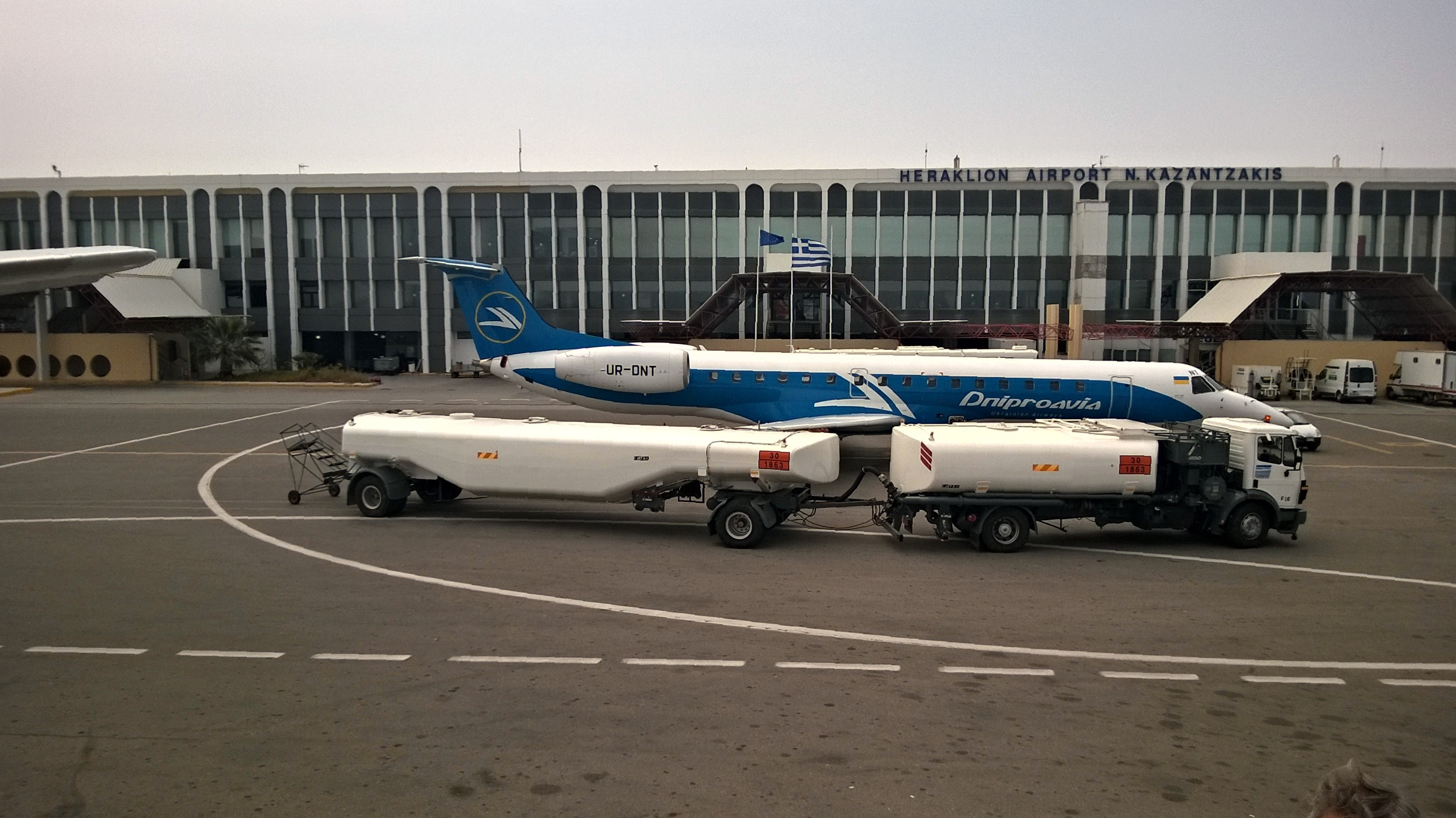
Heraklion International Airport

Heraklion International Airport, or Nikos Kazantzakis Airport is located about 5 kilometres (3 miles) east of the city. The airport is named after Heraklion native Nikos Kazantzakis, a writer and a philosopher. It is the second busiest airport of Greece after Athens International Airport, first in charter flights and the 59th busiest in Europe, because of Crete being a major holiday destination with 8,066,000 passengers in 2022 (List of the busiest airports in Europe). The airfield is shared with the 126th Combat Group of the Hellenic Air Force.

A second airport is currently being constructed at Kastelli, 40 kilometres (25 miles) southeast of the city, adjacent to another Hellenic Air Force base located there. The new airport is expected to take over the increasing number of passengers, as the current airport has reached capacity.

=== Highway network ===
European route E75 runs through the city and connects Heraklion with the three other major cities of Crete: Agios Nikolaos, Chania, and Rethymno.

=== Public transit ===
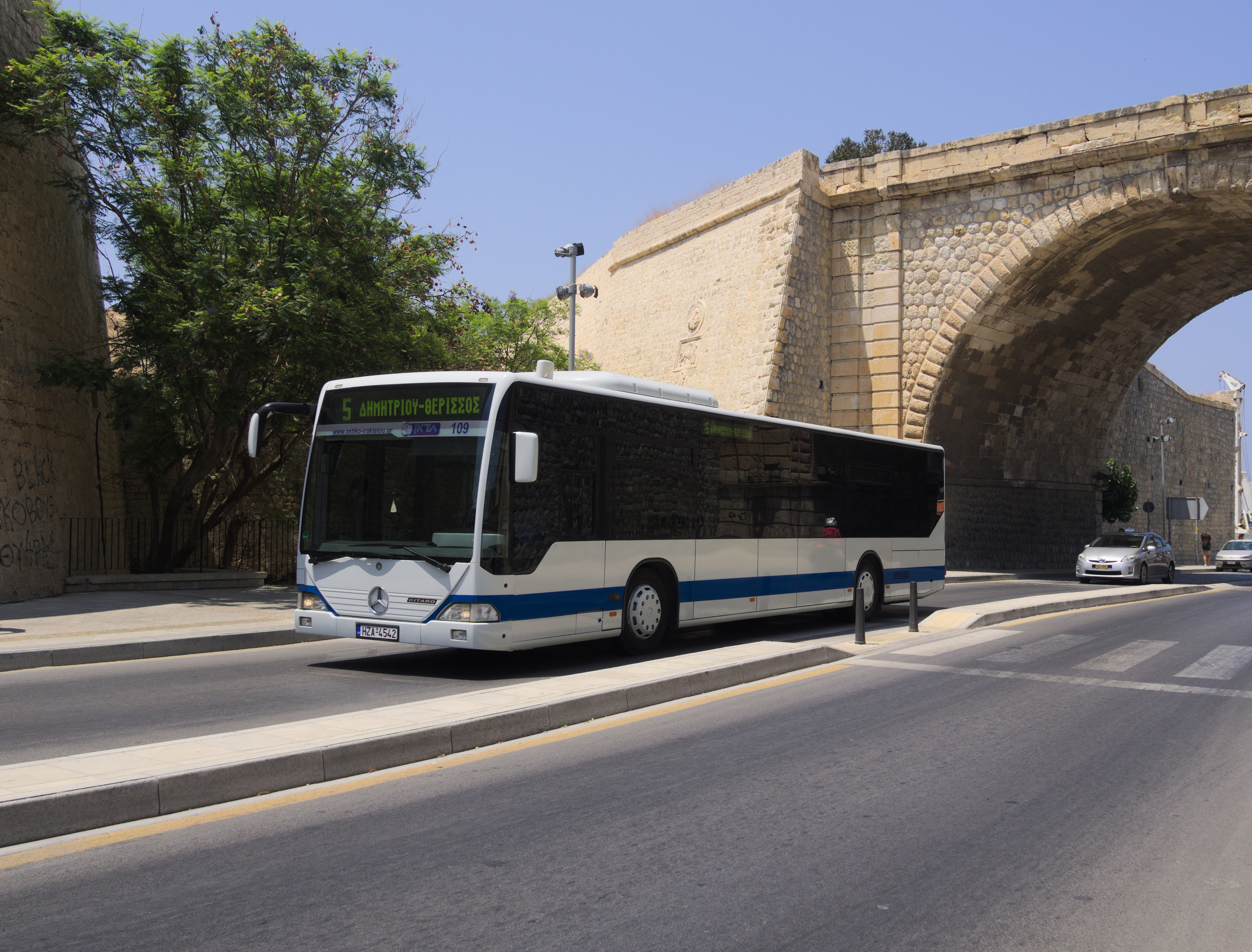
Urban bus in Heraklion

Urban buses serve the city, with 39 different routes. Intercity buses connect Heraklion to many major destinations in Crete.

=== Railway ===
From 1922 to 1937, a working industrial railway connected the Koules in Heraklion to Xiropotamos for the construction of the harbor.

In the summer of 2007, at the Congress of Cretan emigrants held in Heraklion, two engineers, George Nathenas and Vassilis Economopoulos, recommended the development of a railway line in Crete, linking Chania, Rethymno, and Heraklion. No official plans exist for implementing this idea.

== Climate ==
Heraklion has a hot-summer Mediterranean climate (Csa in the Köppen climate classification). Summers are warm to hot and dry with clear skies. Dry hot days are often relieved by seasonal breezes. Winters are mild with moderate rain. Because Heraklion is further south than Athens, it has a warmer climate during winter but cooler during summer because of the Aegean Sea. The maximum temperature during the summer period is usually not more than 28 - 30 °C (Athens normal maximum temperature is about 5 °C higher). The minimum temperature record is -0.8 °C in the airport while in the port it has never dropped below 1.4 °C. Snowfalls are rare with the last significant snowfall with a measurable amount on the ground occurring in February 2004. Heraklion falls in 11a hardiness zone.

Climate data for Heraklion Port 10 m a.s.l. (2007-2024)
Month	Jan	Feb	Mar	Apr	May	Jun	Jul	Aug	Sep	Oct	Nov	Dec	Year
Record high °C (°F)	29.7 (85.5)	29.4 (84.9)	26.4 (79.5)	33.5 (92.3)	38.3 (100.9)	37.2 (99.0)	36.6 (97.9)	38.0 (100.4)	37.3 (99.1)	32.8 (91.0)	31.7 (89.1)	29.6 (85.3)	38.3 (100.9)
Mean daily maximum °C (°F)	15.7 (60.3)	16.1 (61.0)	17.2 (63.0)	19.9 (67.8)	23.1 (73.6)	26.2 (79.2)	28.3 (82.9)	28.3 (82.9)	26.4 (79.5)	23.1 (73.6)	20.8 (69.4)	17.5 (63.5)	21.9 (71.4)
Daily mean °C (°F)	13.1 (55.6)	13.5 (56.3)	14.6 (58.3)	17.2 (63.0)	20.5 (68.9)	24.1 (75.4)	26.6 (79.9)	26.7 (80.1)	24.4 (75.9)	20.9 (69.6)	18.4 (65.1)	15.0 (59.0)	19.6 (67.3)
Mean daily minimum °C (°F)	10.5 (50.9)	10.8 (51.4)	11.9 (53.4)	14.5 (58.1)	17.8 (64.0)	21.9 (71.4)	24.9 (76.8)	25.1 (77.2)	22.4 (72.3)	18.7 (65.7)	15.9 (60.6)	12.5 (54.5)	17.2 (63.0)
Record low °C (°F)	1.4 (34.5)	2.4 (36.3)	3.4 (38.1)	9.1 (48.4)	12.9 (55.2)	15.6 (60.1)	19.9 (67.8)	20.7 (69.3)	15.8 (60.4)	11.6 (52.9)	9.3 (48.7)	5.0 (41.0)	1.4 (34.5)
Average rainfall mm (inches)	61.7 (2.43)	49.0 (1.93)	31.4 (1.24)	13.0 (0.51)	12.8 (0.50)	4.1 (0.16)	0.2 (0.01)	1.6 (0.06)	15.2 (0.60)	43.8 (1.72)	32.4 (1.28)	53.4 (2.10)	318.6 (12.54)
Source 1: National Observatory of Athens Monthly Bulletins (May 2007 - Jan 2024)
Source 2: Heraklion Port N.O.A station and World Meteorological Organization

Climate data for Heraklion (Averages: Nikos Kazantzakis Airport 1991–2020; Extremes: City Station 1951–present)
Month	Jan	Feb	Mar	Apr	May	Jun	Jul	Aug	Sep	Oct	Nov	Dec	Year
Record high °C (°F)	29.9 (85.8)	28.8 (83.8)	34.0 (93.2)	37.5 (99.5)	38.0 (100.4)	41.3 (106.3)	43.6 (110.5)	44.5 (112.1)	39.5 (103.1)	37.0 (98.6)	32.8 (91.0)	28.5 (83.3)	44.5 (112.1)
Mean daily maximum °C (°F)	15.2 (59.4)	15.3 (59.5)	16.8 (62.2)	20.1 (68.2)	24.3 (75.7)	28.5 (83.3)	30.3 (86.5)	30.2 (86.4)	27.5 (81.5)	24.0 (75.2)	20.1 (68.2)	16.7 (62.1)	22.4 (72.4)
Daily mean °C (°F)	12.1 (53.8)	12.2 (54.0)	13.5 (56.3)	16.5 (61.7)	20.3 (68.5)	24.4 (75.9)	26.5 (79.7)	26.6 (79.9)	24.4 (75.9)	20.8 (69.4)	17.0 (62.6)	13.8 (56.8)	19.0 (66.2)
Mean daily minimum °C (°F)	9.4 (48.9)	9.2 (48.6)	10.2 (50.4)	12.8 (55.0)	16.2 (61.2)	20.3 (68.5)	22.7 (72.9)	22.9 (73.2)	20.4 (68.7)	17.5 (63.5)	14.0 (57.2)	11.0 (51.8)	15.6 (60.0)
Record low °C (°F)	0.0 (32.0)	−0.8 (30.6)	0.3 (32.5)	4.2 (39.6)	6.0 (42.8)	12.2 (54.0)	14.5 (58.1)	16.6 (61.9)	12.0 (53.6)	8.7 (47.7)	4.2 (39.6)	2.4 (36.3)	−0.8 (30.6)
Average rainfall mm (inches)	81.3 (3.20)	60.1 (2.37)	49.4 (1.94)	24.2 (0.95)	12.8 (0.50)	4.2 (0.17)	0.8 (0.03)	1.2 (0.05)	17.5 (0.69)	43.1 (1.70)	56.4 (2.22)	82.2 (3.24)	433.2 (17.06)
Average precipitation days (≥ 1.0 mm)	10.1	9.1	6.9	3.4	1.9	0.5	0.1	0.1	1.3	4.9	6.0	8.9	53.2
Average rainy days	13.6	11.2	9.6	5.8	3.8	1.1	0.2	0.3	2.4	6.7	9.1	13.0	76.8
Average relative humidity (%)	71	70	68	64	62	58	58	60	63	67	70	71	65
Average dew point °C (°F)	7.1 (44.8)	6.9 (44.4)	7.7 (45.9)	9.7 (49.5)	12.8 (55.0)	15.6 (60.1)	17.6 (63.7)	18.2 (64.8)	16.5 (61.7)	14.4 (57.9)	11.5 (52.7)	8.6 (47.5)	12.2 (54.0)
Mean monthly sunshine hours	117.8	124.3	176.7	228.0	300.7	351.0	384.4	365.8	282.0	220.1	144.0	—	—

</ref>

Climate data for Heraklion
Month	Jan	Feb	Mar	Apr	May	Jun	Jul	Aug	Sep	Oct	Nov	Dec	Year
Mean number of days with thunder	3.6	3.0	2.9	1.8	1.5	0.9	0.2	0.1	1.2	4.1	3.5	4.4	27.2
Mean number of days with hail	0.3	0.6	0.5	0.0	0.1	0.0	0.0	0.0	0.0	0.0	0.0	0.3	1.8
Average sea temperature °C (°F)	17.1 (62.8)	16.4 (61.5)	16.5 (61.7)	17.1 (62.8)	19.5 (67.1)	23.0 (73.4)	25.4 (77.7)	26.1 (79.0)	25.4 (77.7)	23.3 (73.9)	20.6 (69.1)	18.4 (65.1)	20.7 (69.3)
Mean daily daylight hours	10.0	10.8	11.9	13.2	14.2	14.8	14.5	13.6	12.4	11.2	10.2	9.7	12.2
Average Ultraviolet index	2	3	5	7	9	10	10	9	7	4	3	2	6
Source 1: NOAA (days with thunder and hail 1961-1990)
Source 2: Weather Atlas

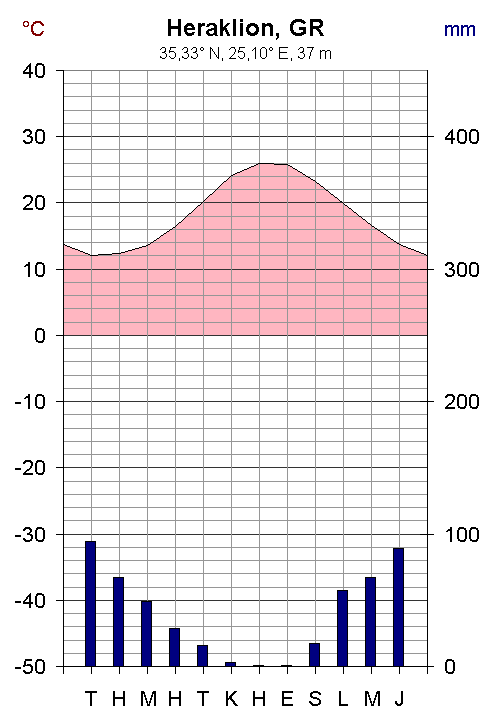
Climate graph of Heraklion

Climate Data

== Educational and Research Institutions ==
- University of Crete
- Hellenic Mediterranean University
- MBS College
- Foundation for Research & Technology - Hellas
- Nicolas Kitsikis Library
- Vikelaia Library
- 3rd High School of Heraklion
- 5th High School of Heraklion

== Culture ==
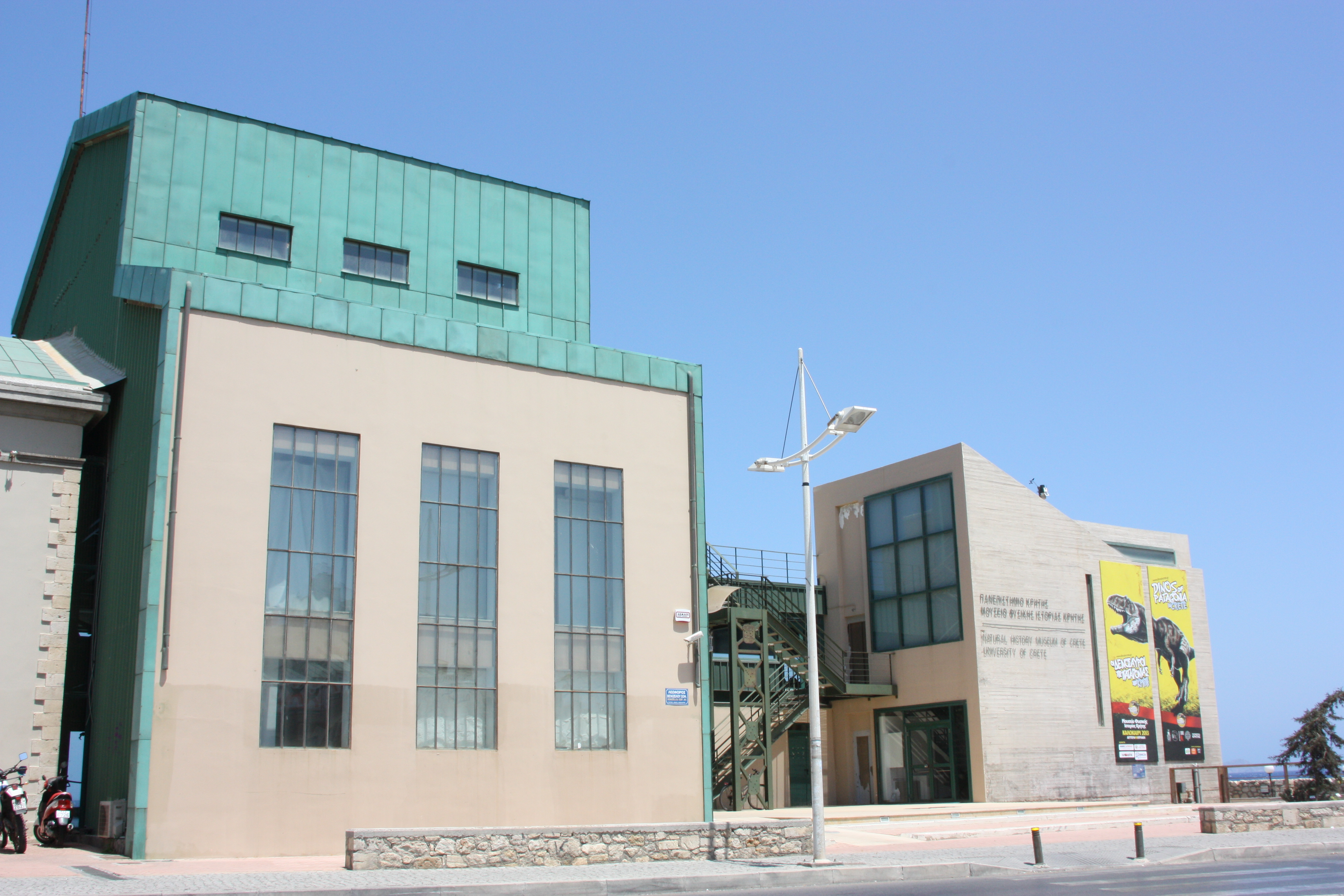
Natural History Museum of Crete

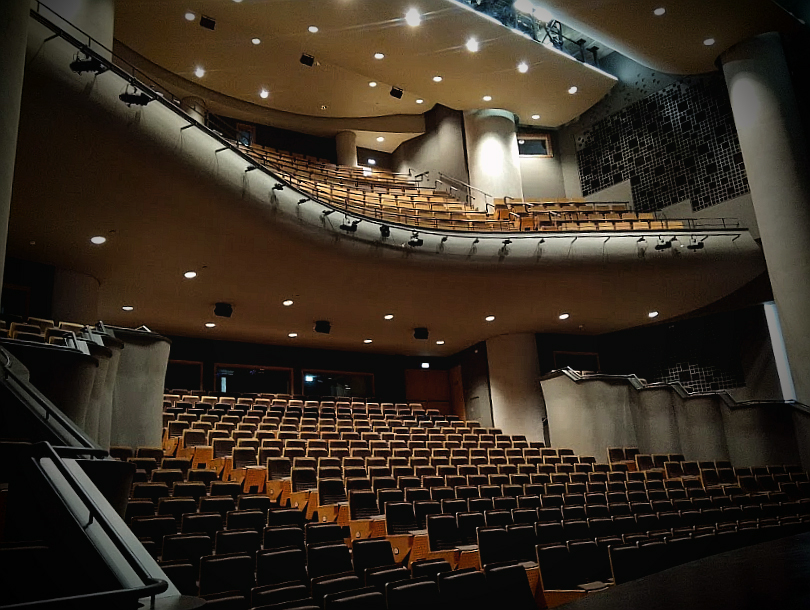
Cultural and Conference Center

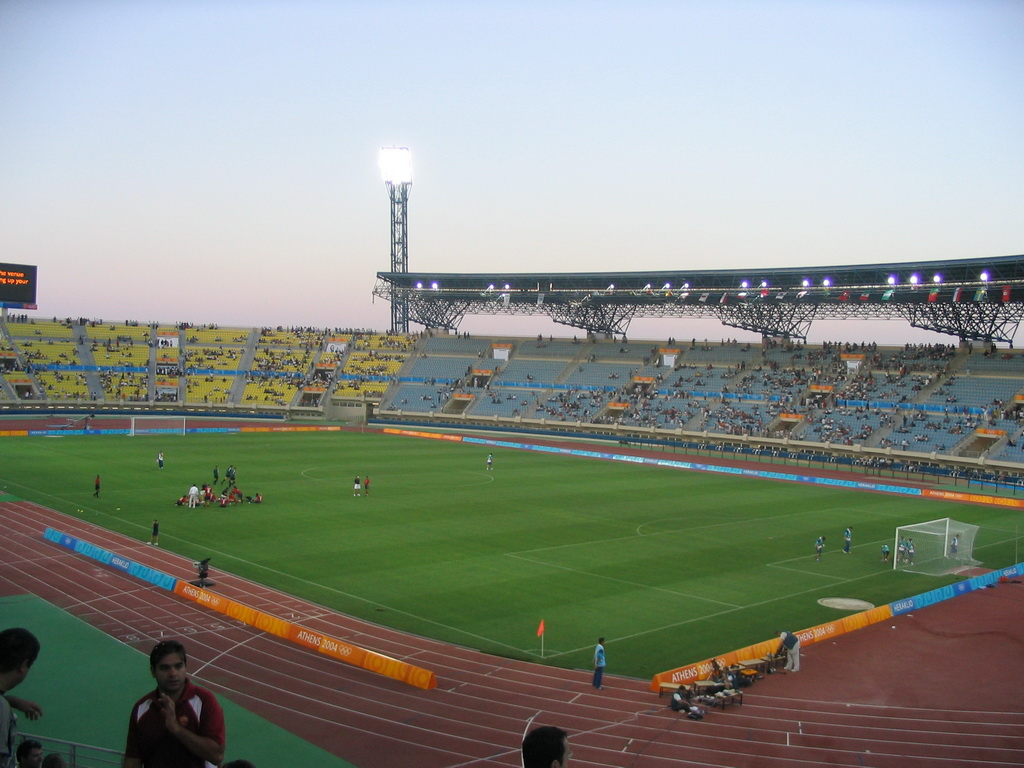
Pankritio Stadium

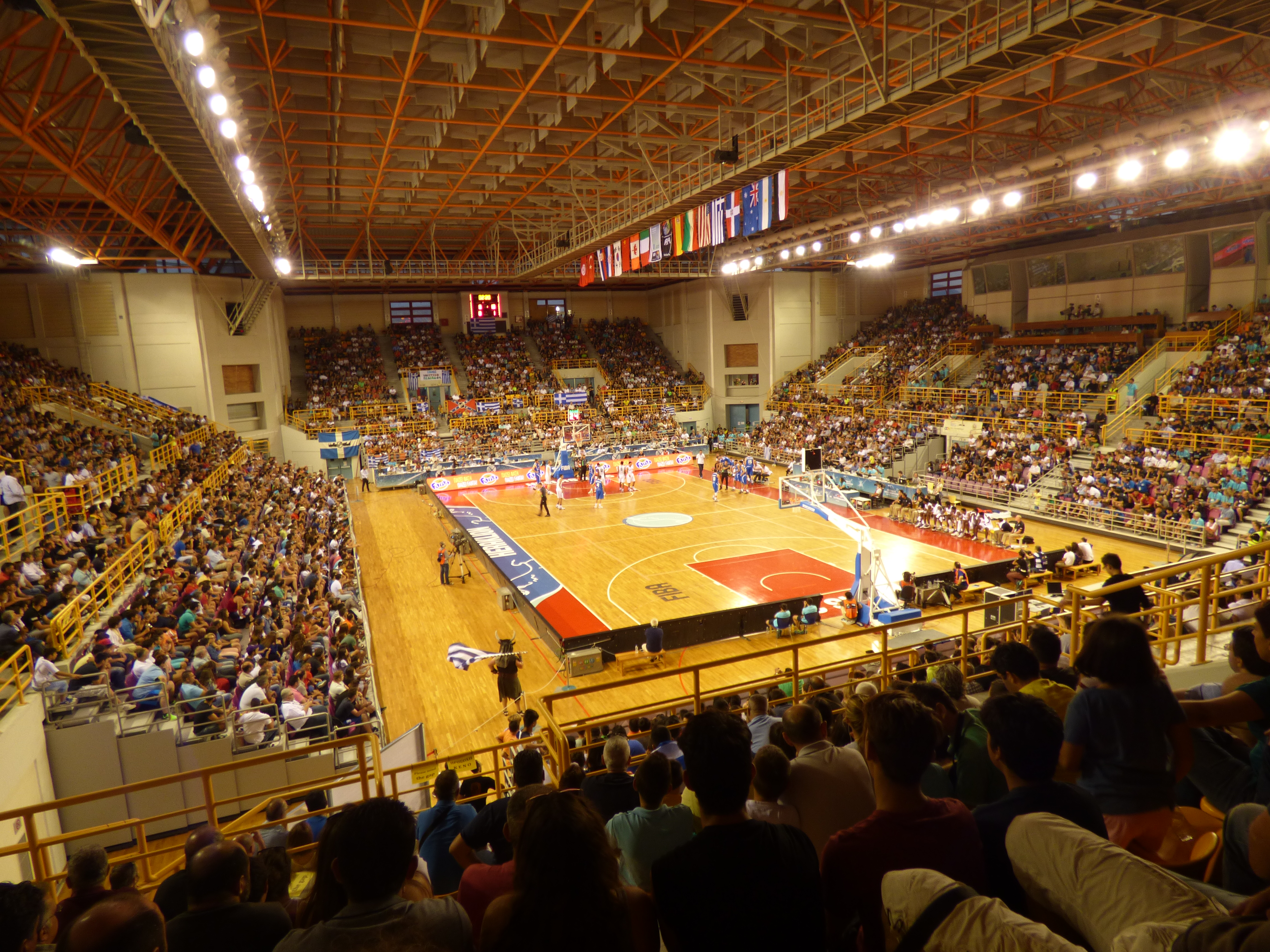
Heraklion Indoor Sports Arena

=== Museums ===
- Heraklion Archaeological Museum
- Cretaquarium
- Historical Museum of Crete
- Natural History Museum
- The Battle of Crete and National Resistance Museum
- Nikos Kazantzakis Museum
- Collection of Agia Aikaterini of Sinai
- Museum of Visual Arts

=== Arts ===
The Cultural and Conference Center of Heraklion is a centre for the performing arts.

=== Sports ===
The city is home to several sports clubs. Most notably, Heraklion hosts OFI and Ergotelis, two football clubs with earlier presence in the Greek Super League, the top tier of the Greek football league system. Furthermore, the city is the headquarters of the Heraklion Football Clubs Association, which administers football in the entire region. Other notable sport clubs include Iraklio B.C. (basketball), Atsalenios (football) and Irodotos (football) in the suburbs of Atsalenio and Nea Alikarnassos respectively.

Notable Sport clubs based in Heraklion
Club	Founded	Sports	Current Season
OFI	1925	Football, Basketball	Super League, Greek C Basket League
Ergotelis	1929	Football, Basketball	Gamma Ethniki, Cretan Basket League
Iraklio	1928	Basketball	Cretan Basket League
Irodotos	1932	Football, Basketball	Heraklion FCA First Division, Cretan Basket League
Atsalenios	1951	Football	Gamma Ethniki

=== Local TV stations ===
- Channel 4
- Creta Channel
- Kriti TV
- MyTV

== Notable people ==
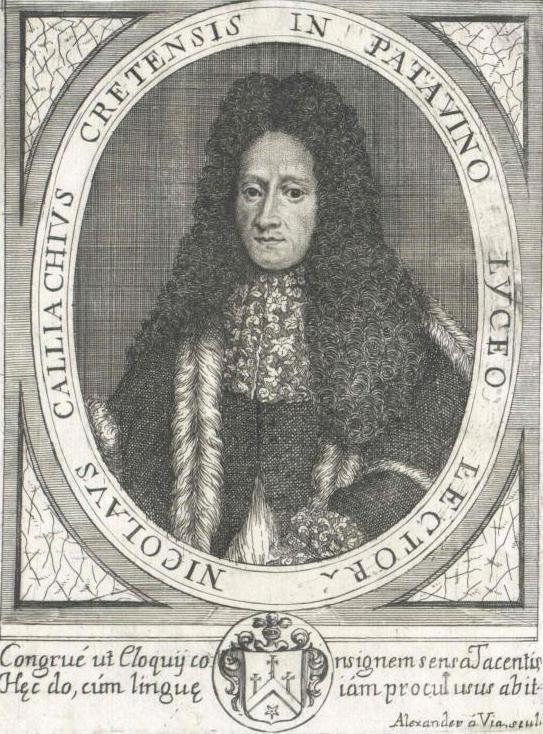
Nicholas Kalliakis was a significant Renaissance humanist, scholar and philosopher from Heraklion.

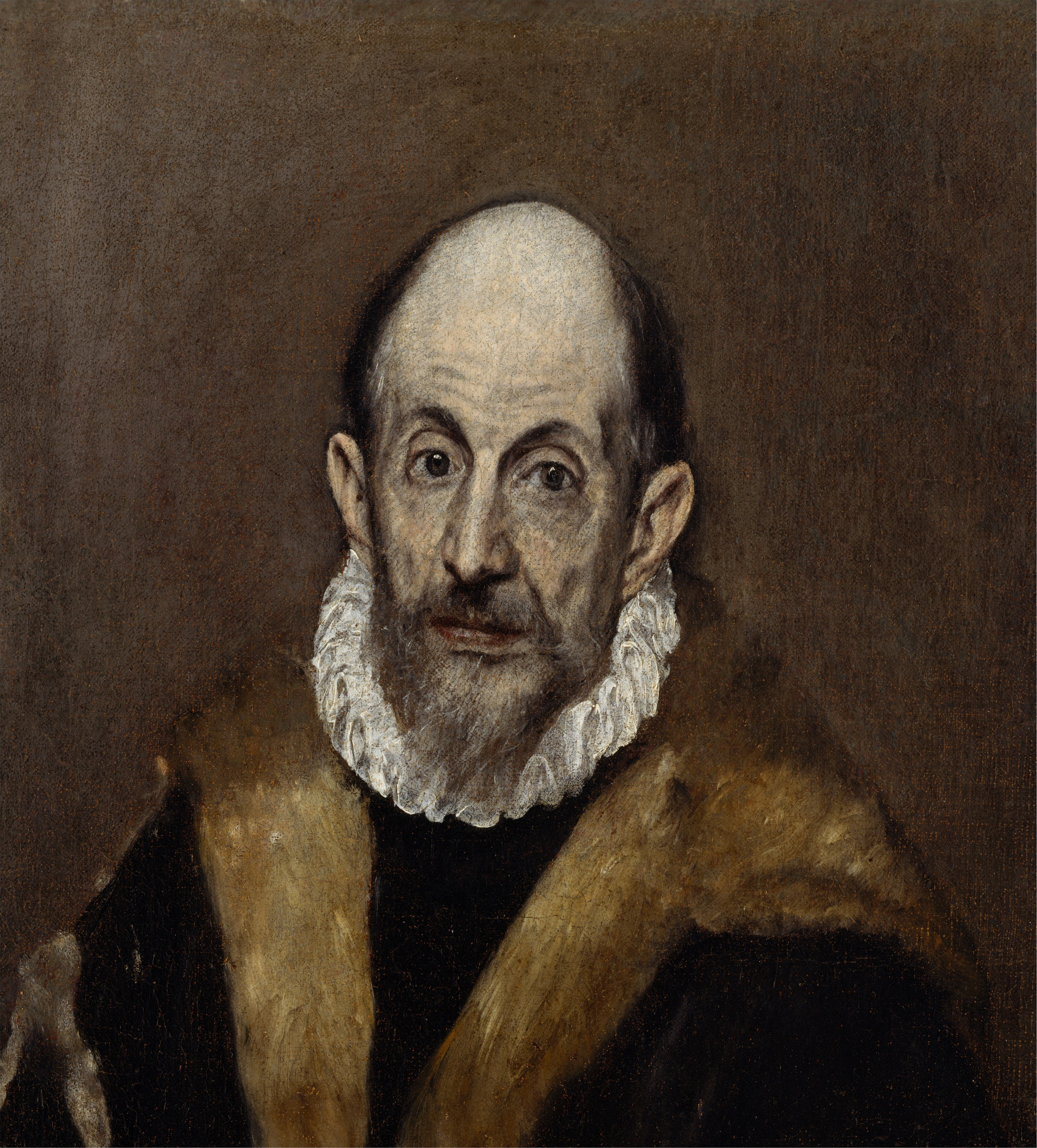
El Greco (Dominikos Theotokopoulos)

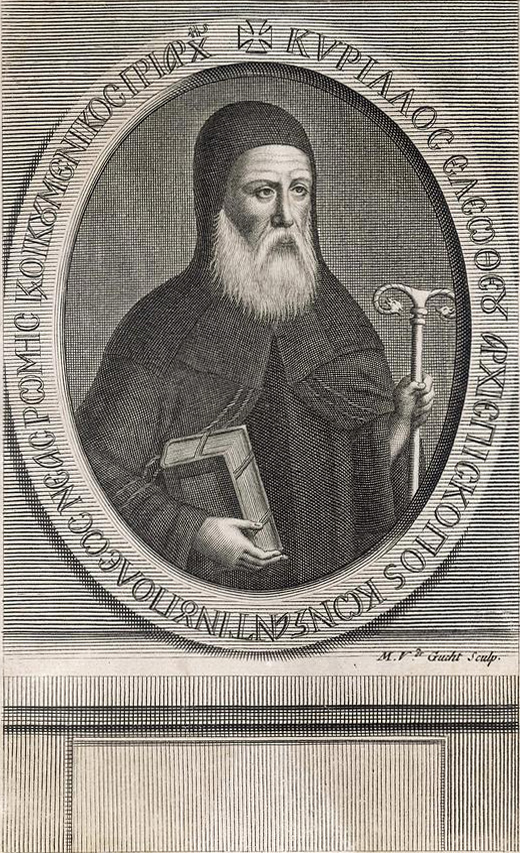
Cyril Lucaris

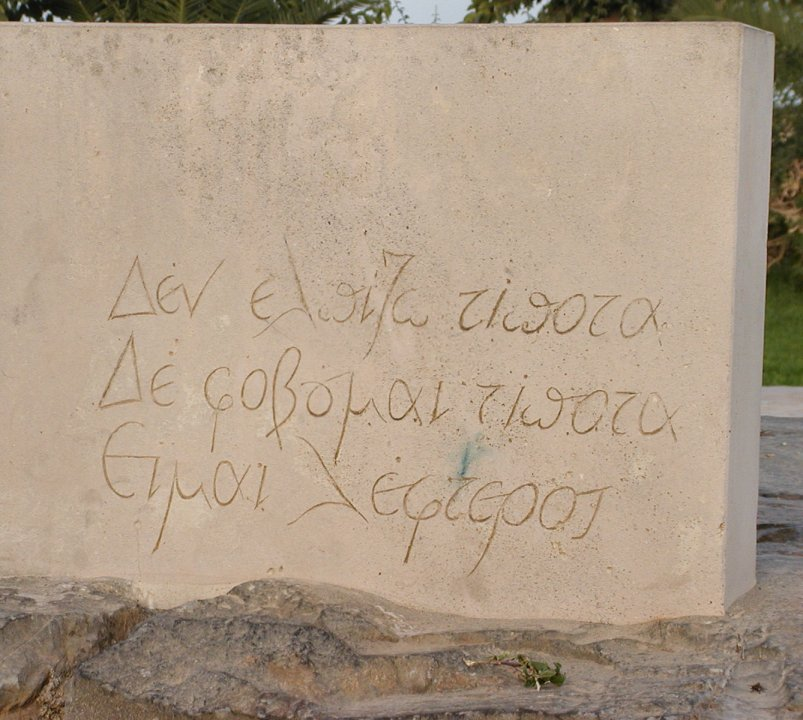
Epitaph on Nikos Kazantzakis' grave. I hope for nothing, I fear nothing, I'm free.

Heraklion has been the home town of some of Greece's most significant people, including the novelist Nikos Kazantzakis (best known for Zorba the Greek), the poet and Nobel Prize winner Odysseas Elytis and the world-famous painter Domenicos Theotokopoulos (El Greco).

=== Literature ===
- Elli Alexiou (1894–1988) author
- Minás Dimákis (1913–1980) poet
- Odysseas Elytis (1911–1996) Nobel awarded poet
- Tess Fragoulis, Greek-Canadian author
- Rea Galanaki (born 1947) author
- Giritli Ali Aziz Efendi (1749–1798), author and diplomat
- Nikos Kazantzakis (1883–1957) author
- Menelaos Parlamas (1911–1997) author and scholar
- Pedro de Candia, (1485–1542) author and travel writer, recorded the Spanish Conquest of the Americas
- Stephanos Sahlikis (1330 – after 1391) poet
- Lili Zografou (1922–1998) author

=== Scientists and academia ===
- Nicholas Kalliakis (1645–1707) Greek Cretan scholar and philosopher
- Niccolò Comneno Papadopoli (1655–1740) lawyer, historian and librarian
- Andreas Musalus (c. 1665 – c. 1721) Greek Cretan professor of mathematics, philosopher and architectural theorist
- Francesco Barozzi (1537–1604) mathematician and astronomer
- Joseph Solomon Delmedigo (1591–1655) rabbi, author, physician, mathematician and musical theorist
- Fotis Kafatos biologist, President of the European Research Council
- Spyros Kokotos (1933–present) architect
- Marcus Musurus (Markos Mousouros) (1470–1517) scholar and philosopher
- Peter of Candia also known as Antipope Alexander V: philosopher and scholar
- Joseph Sifakis (1946–present) computer scientist, co-recipient of the 2007 Turing Award
- Michael N. Katehakis (1952–present) applied mathematician and operations researcher at Rutgers University
- Gerasimos Vlachos (1607–1685), scholar
- Simone Stratigo (c. 1733–1824), Greek mathematician and a nautical science expert, whose family was from Heraklion (Candia)

=== Painting and sculpture ===
- Theophanes (c. 1500–1559) painter of icons
- Michael Damaskinos (1530/35–1592/93) painter of icons
- Georgios Klontzas (1535–1608) painter
- El Greco (1541–1614) mannerist painter, sculptor and architect
- Yiannis Parmakelis (born 1932), sculptor
- Andreas Ritzos (1422–1492) painter of icons
- Aristidis Vlassis (1947–2015) painter
- Konstantinos Volanakis (1837–1907) painter
- George Sfougaras (born 1959) painter

=== Film industry ===
- Rika Diallina (born 1934), actress and model, Miss Hellas
- Ilya Livykou (1919–2002), actress
- Sapfo Notara (1907–1985), actress
- Yannis Smaragdis (born 1946), film director

=== Music ===
- Rena Kyriakou (1918–1994) pianist
- Francisco Leontaritis (Francesco Londarit) (1518–1572) composer
- Giannis Markopoulos (born 1939) composer
- Myron Michailidis (born 1968) conductor
- Manolis Rasoulis (1945–2011) lyrics writer
- Notis Sfakianakis (born 1959) singer
- Lena Platonos, pianist

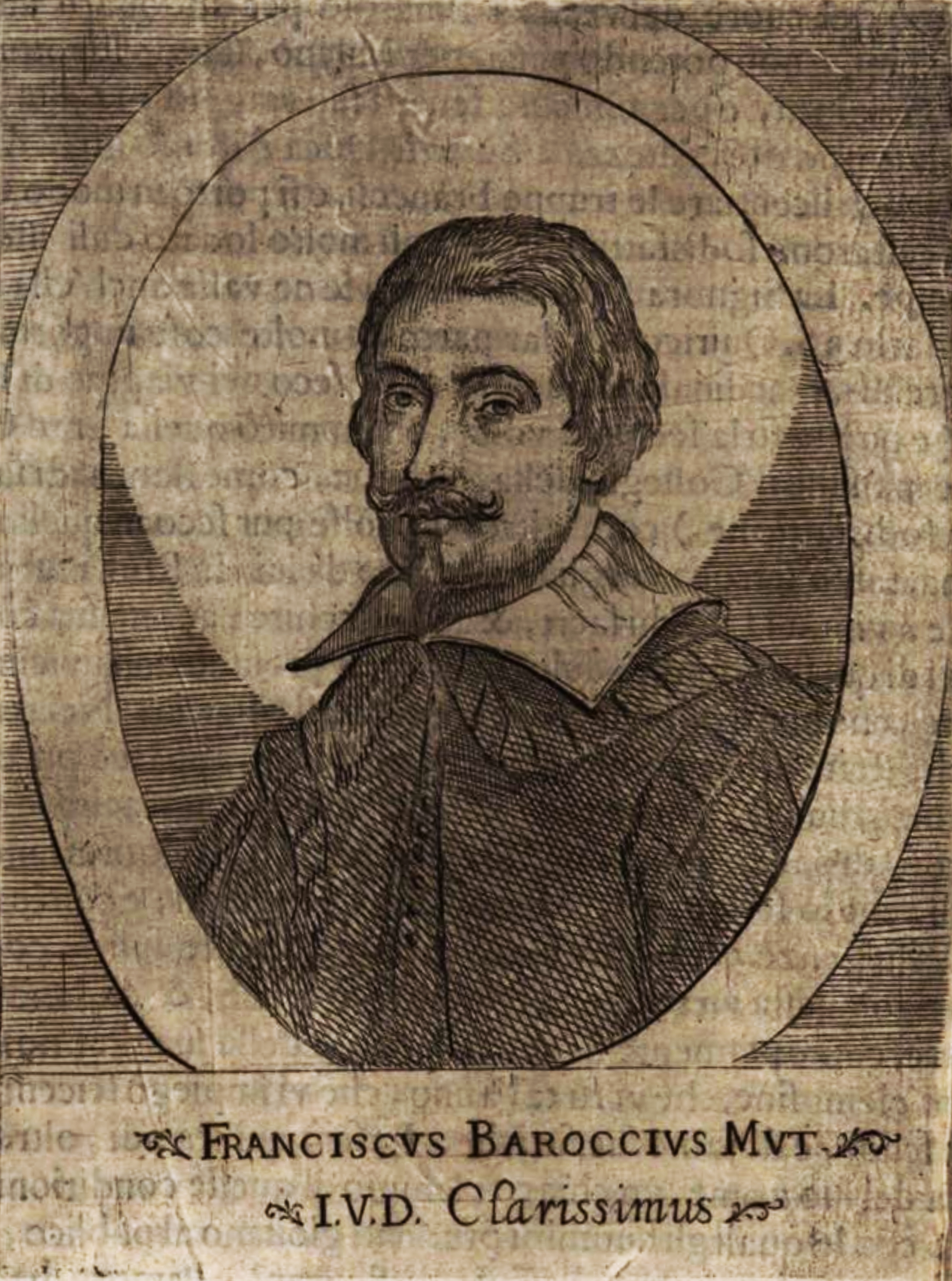
Francesco Barozzi

=== Spirituality ===
- Maria Papapetros - psychic, spiritual healer, spiritual consultant

=== Sports ===
- Kyle Hamilton (born 2001), American football player
- Nikos Machlas (born 1973), footballer
- Georgios Samaras (born 1985), footballer
- Greg Massialas (born 1956), American fencer
- Michalis Karlis (born 2003), basketball player
- Giorgos Giakoumakis (born 1994), footballer

=== Business ===
- Constantine Corniaktos (1517–1603) wine merchant and wealthiest man in the Eastern European city of Lviv
- Gianna Angelopoulos-Daskalaki (born 1955) business woman, lawyer and politician

=== Politics and law ===
- Emin Ali Bedir Khan (1851–1926), Kurdish diplomat
- Leonidas Kyrkos (1924–2011), politician
- Aristidis Stergiadis (1861–1950) High Commissioner of Smyrna
- Georgios Voulgarakis (born 1959) conservative politician
- Romilos Kedikoglou (born 1940) President of the Court of Cassation of Greece

=== Clergy ===
- Maximos Margunios (1549–1602), bishop of Cyrigo (Kythira)
- Kyrillos Loukaris (1572–1637) theologian, Pope & Patriarch of Alexandria as Cyril III and Ecumenical Patriarch of Constantinople as Cyril I
- Meletius Pegas, Pope & Patriarch of Alexandria
- Theodore II (born 1954) Pope & Patriarch of Alexandria and all Africa
- Peter Phillarges (c. 1339–1410) (also Pietro Di Candia, later Pope Alexander V)
- Makarios Griniezakis (born 1973) Greek Orthodox Archbishop of the Holy Archdiocese of Australia
- Arsenios Kardamakis (born 1973) Greek Orthodox Metropolitan of Austria and Exarch of Hungary

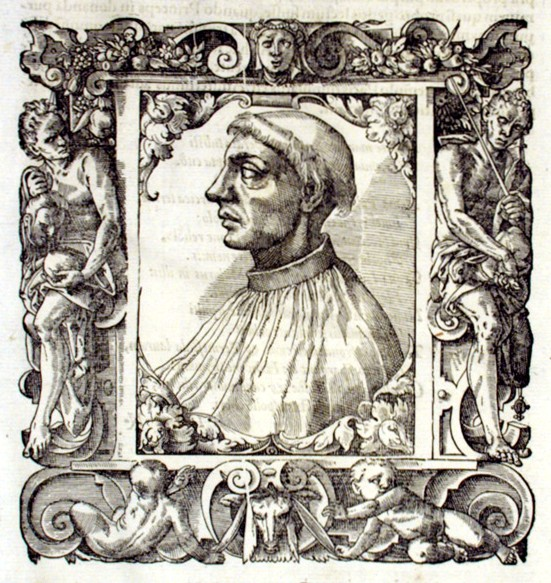
Marcus Musurus

=== Fashion ===
- Maria Spiridaki (1984) fashion model and television presenter

== International relations ==
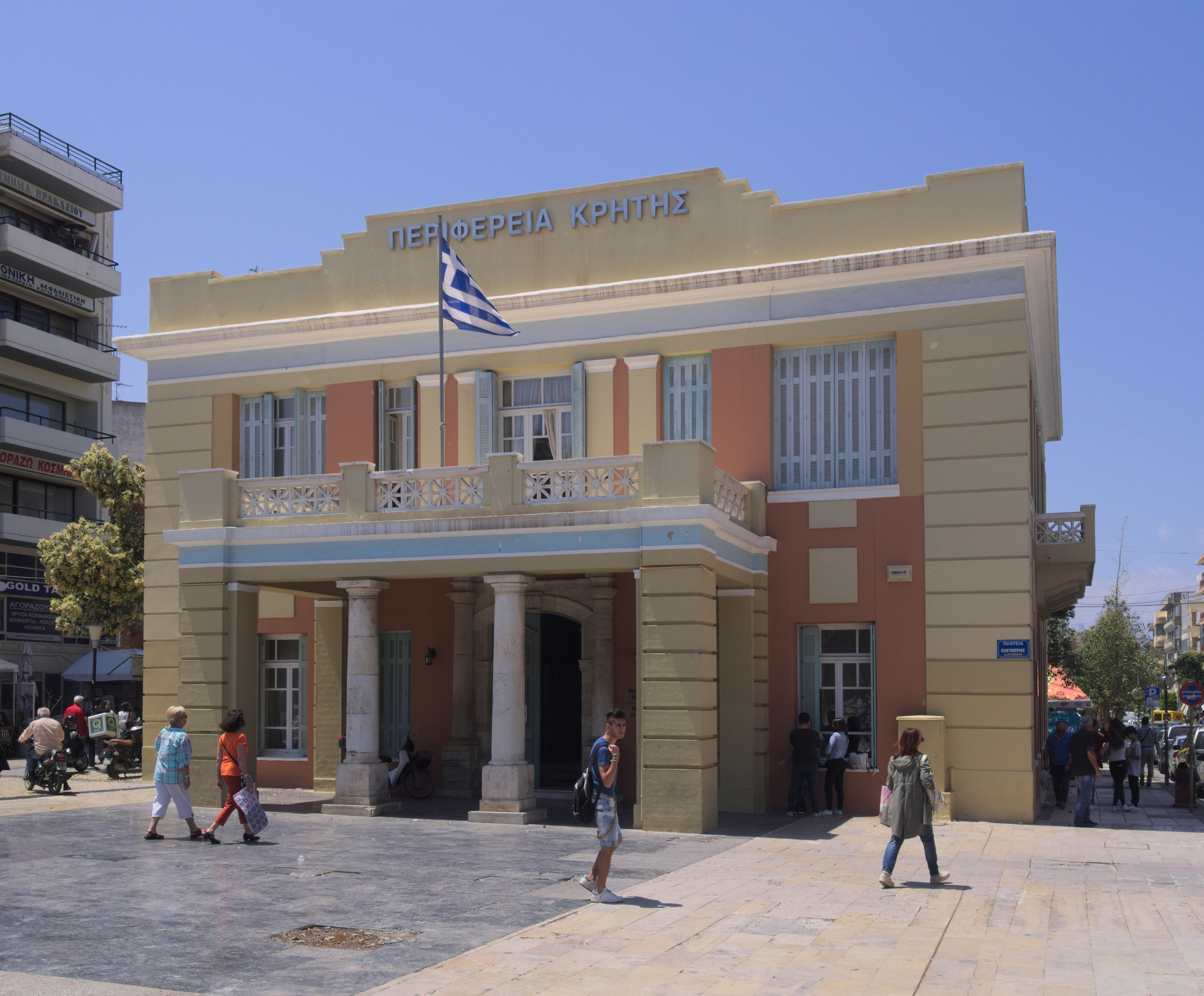
Prefecture of Crete

=== Consulates ===
Austria; Belgium; Czech Republic; Denmark; Finland; France; Germany; Hungary	Republic of Ireland; Italy; Netherlands; Norway; Philippines; Poland; South Korea; United Kingdom

== Twin towns and sister cities ==
Heraklion is twinned with:

- Limassol, Cyprus
- Constanța, Romania (1992)
- Odesa, Ukraine (1992)
- Toledo, Spain (2017)
- Nizhny Novgorod, Russia (2018)
- Tampa, United States (2019)
- Čukarica, Serbia (2019)
- Ningbo, China (2019)

== Location ==
	Fira
Chania – Rethymno		Agios Nikolaos
Tympaki – Moires	Archanes	Ierapetra

== Gallery ==
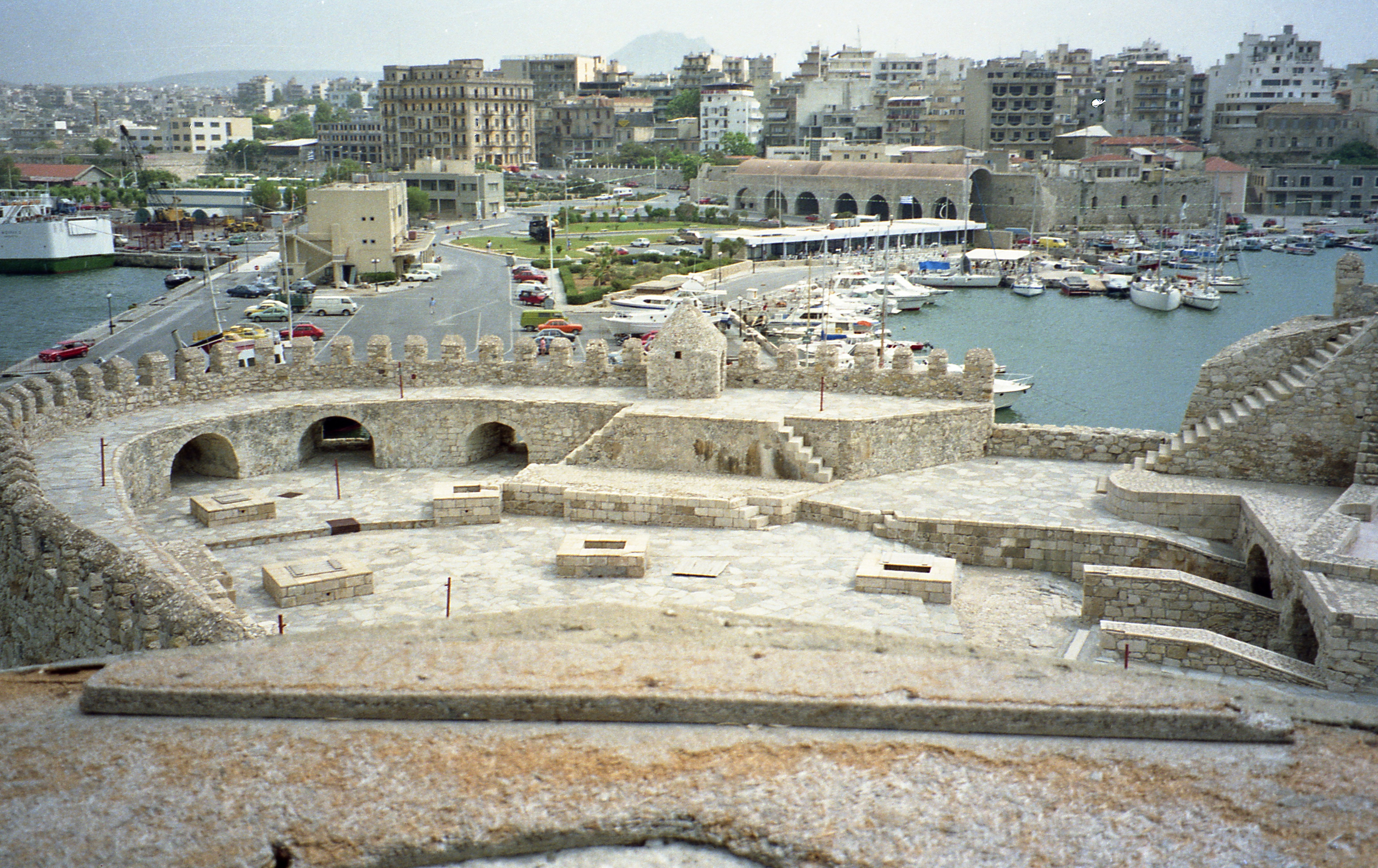
View of the port from the fortress

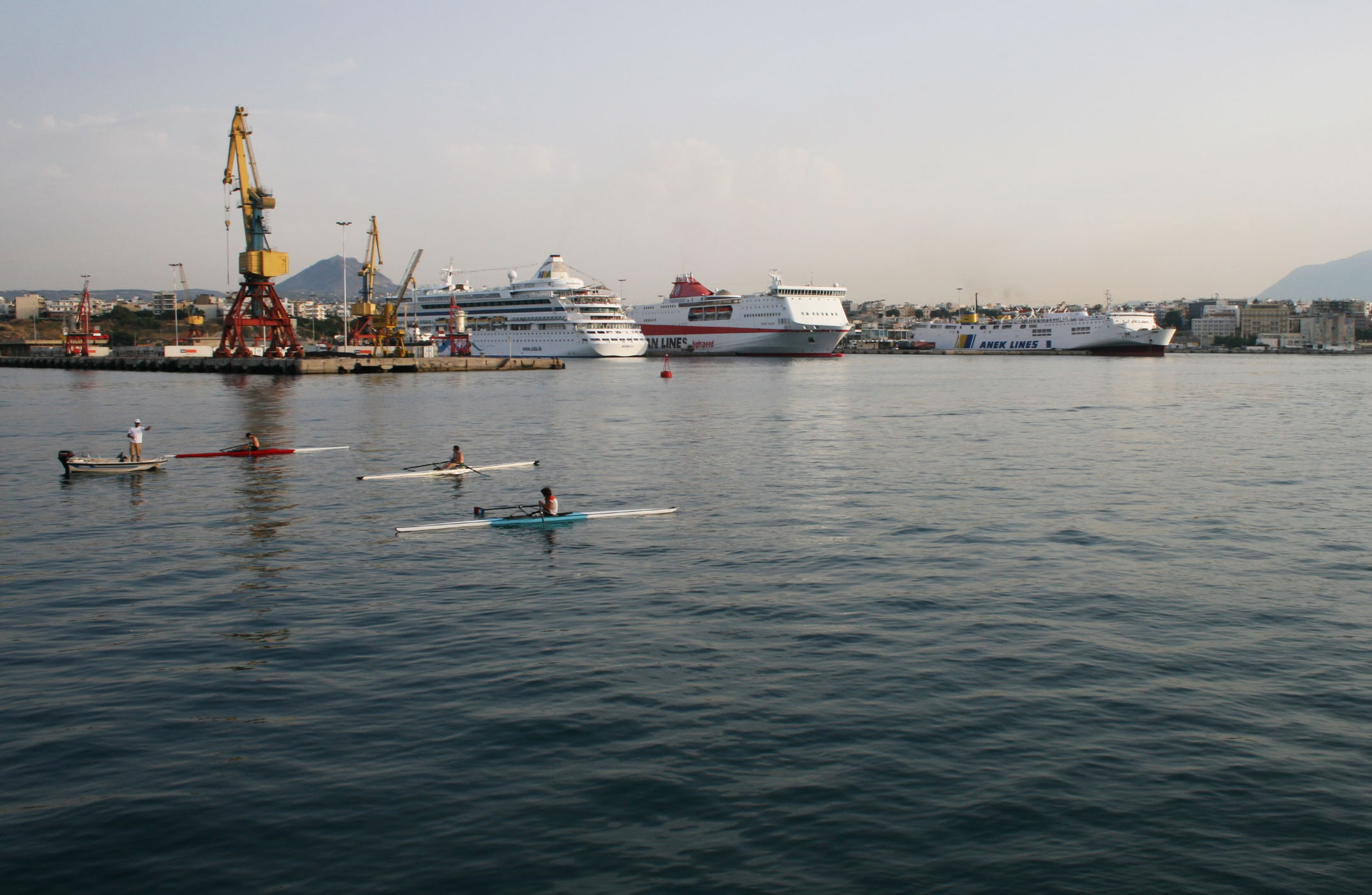
View of the port

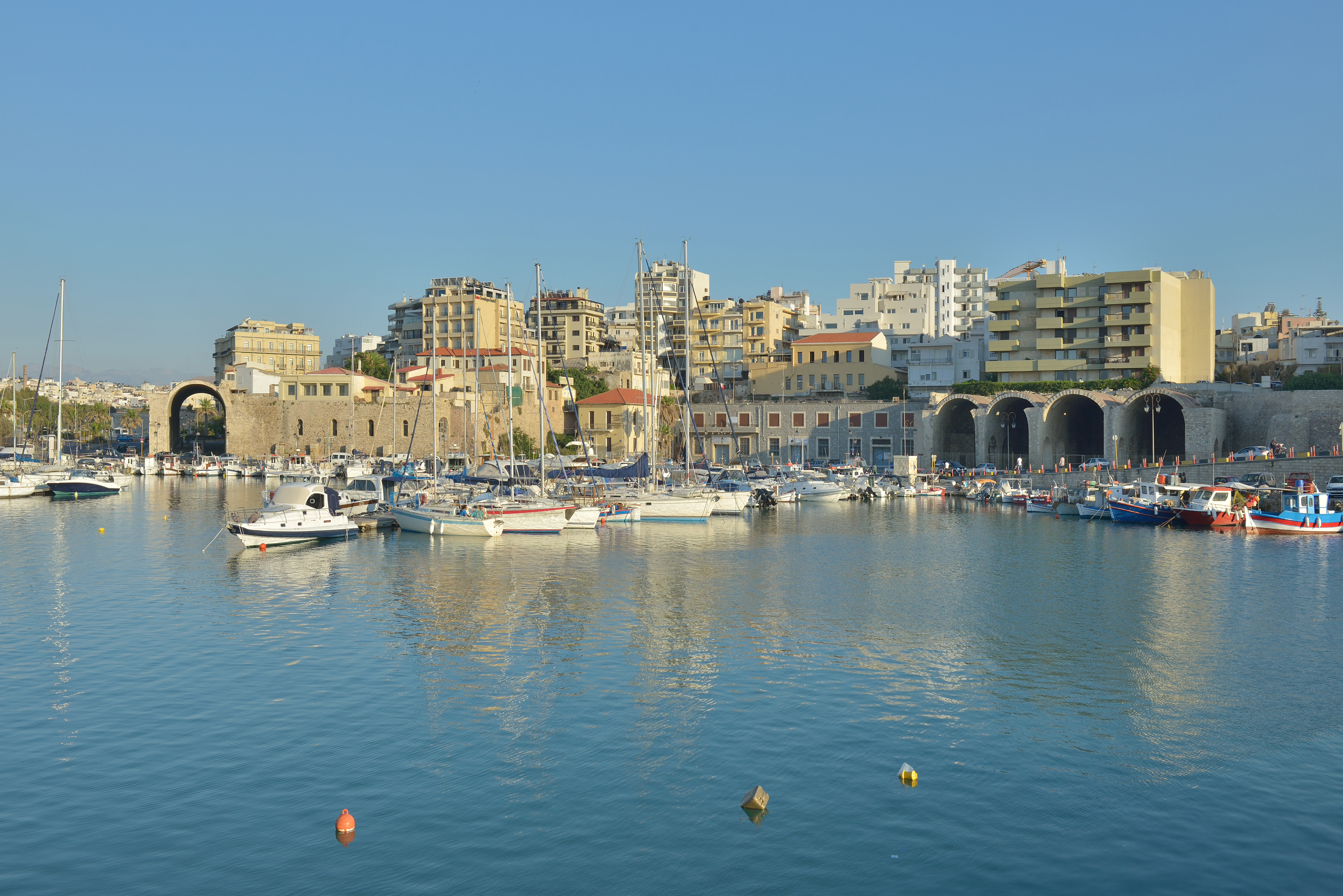
The harbour

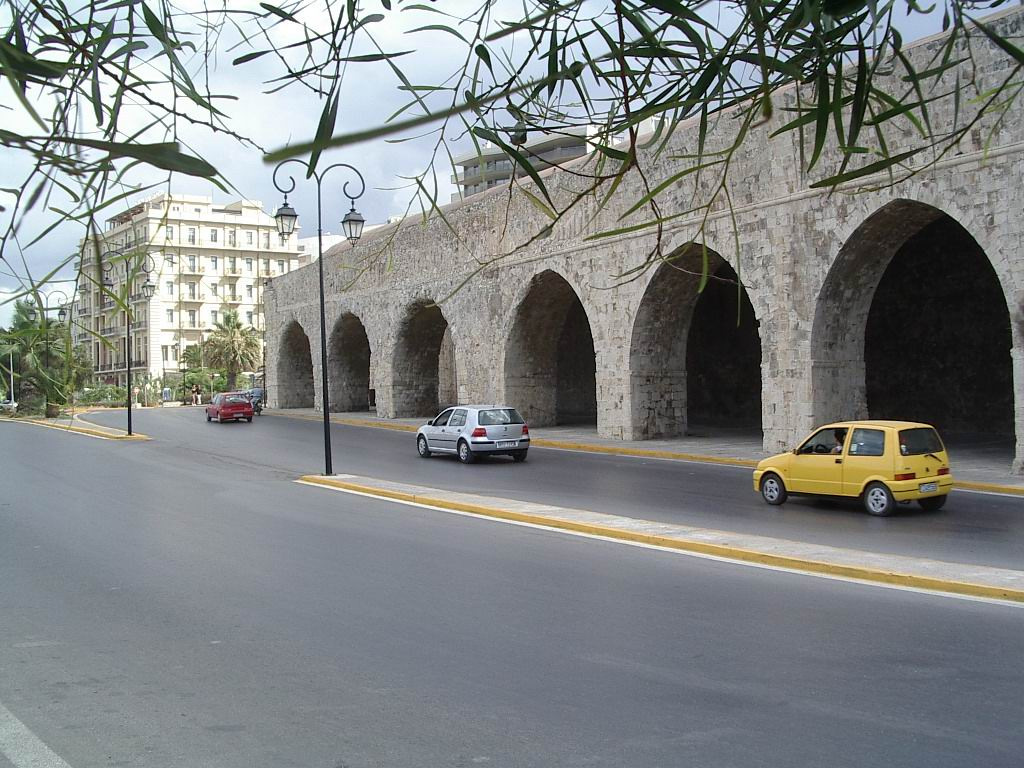
Α part of the Venetian harbour (used as shipyards)

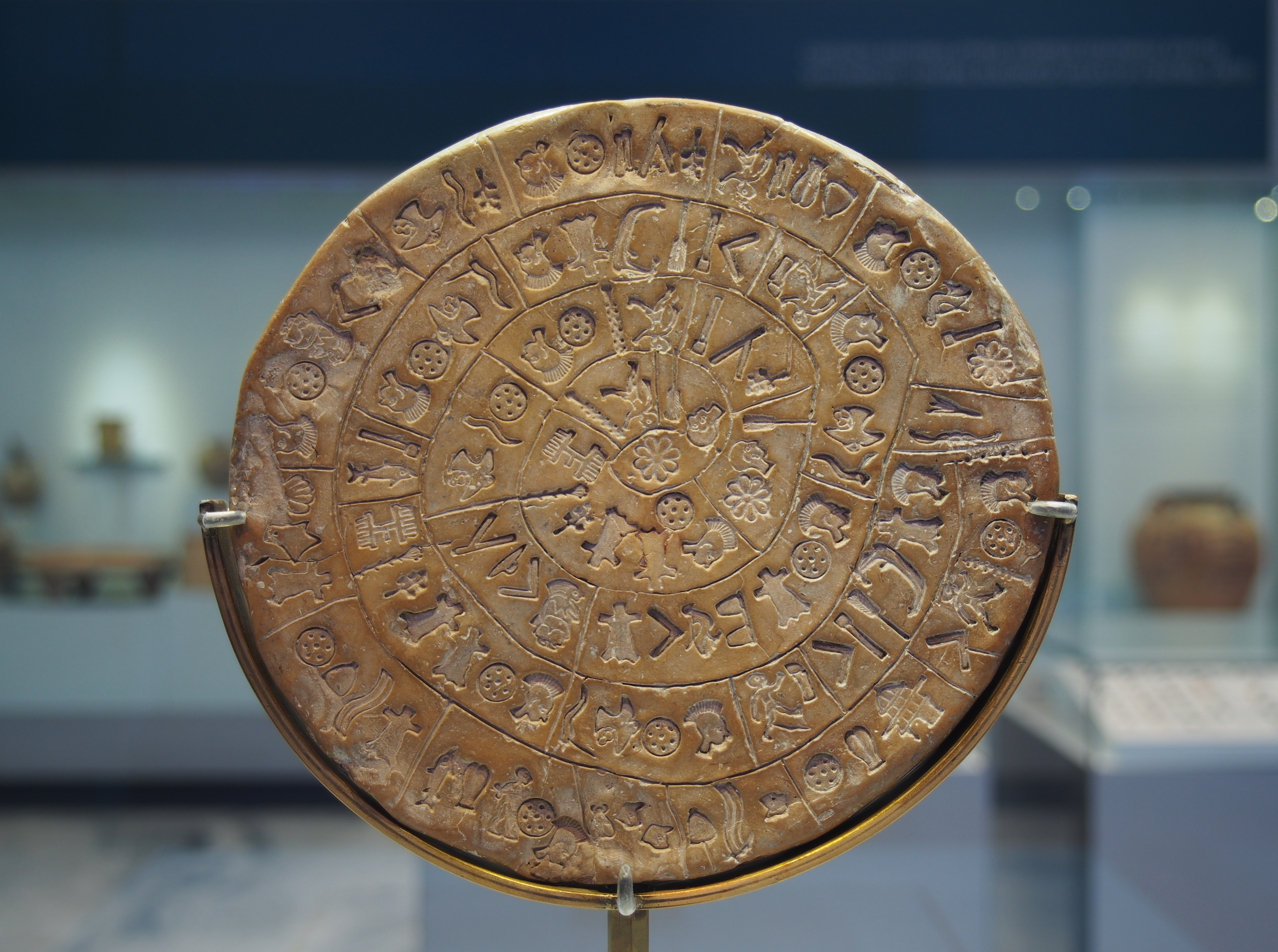
The Phaistos Disk (2nd millennium BC) in Heraklion Archaeological Museum

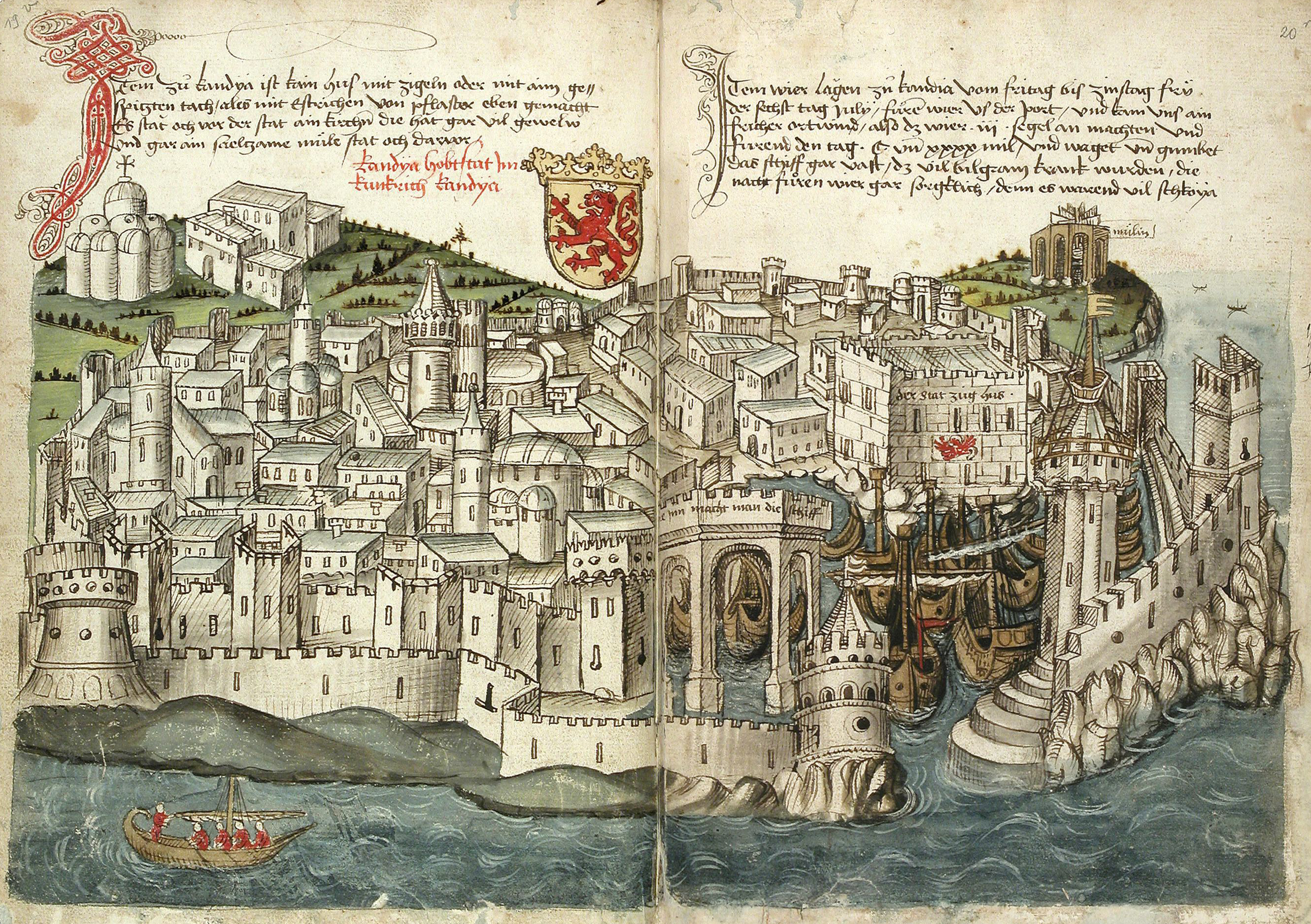
Depiction of Candia, 1487

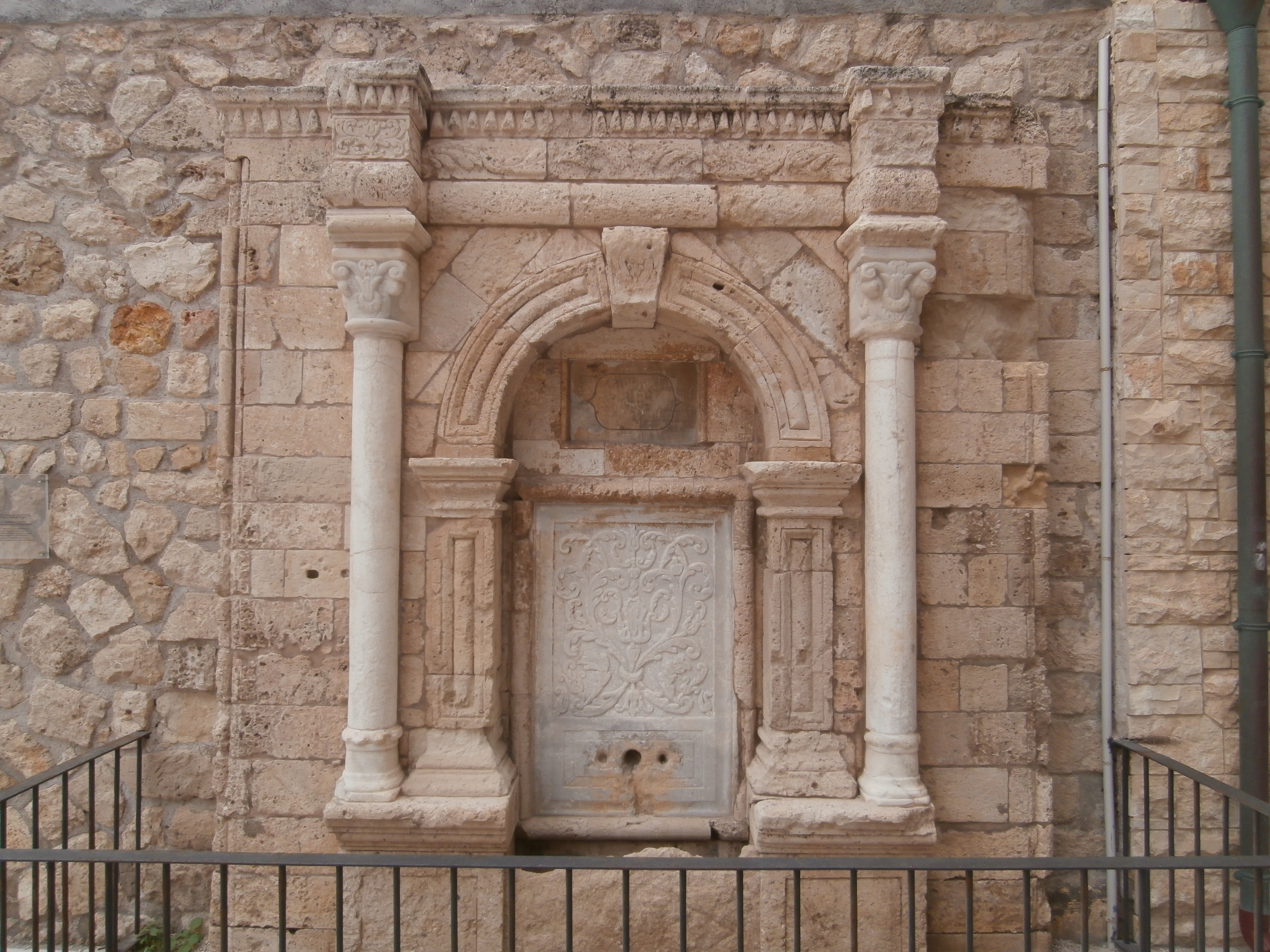
Idomeneas fountain

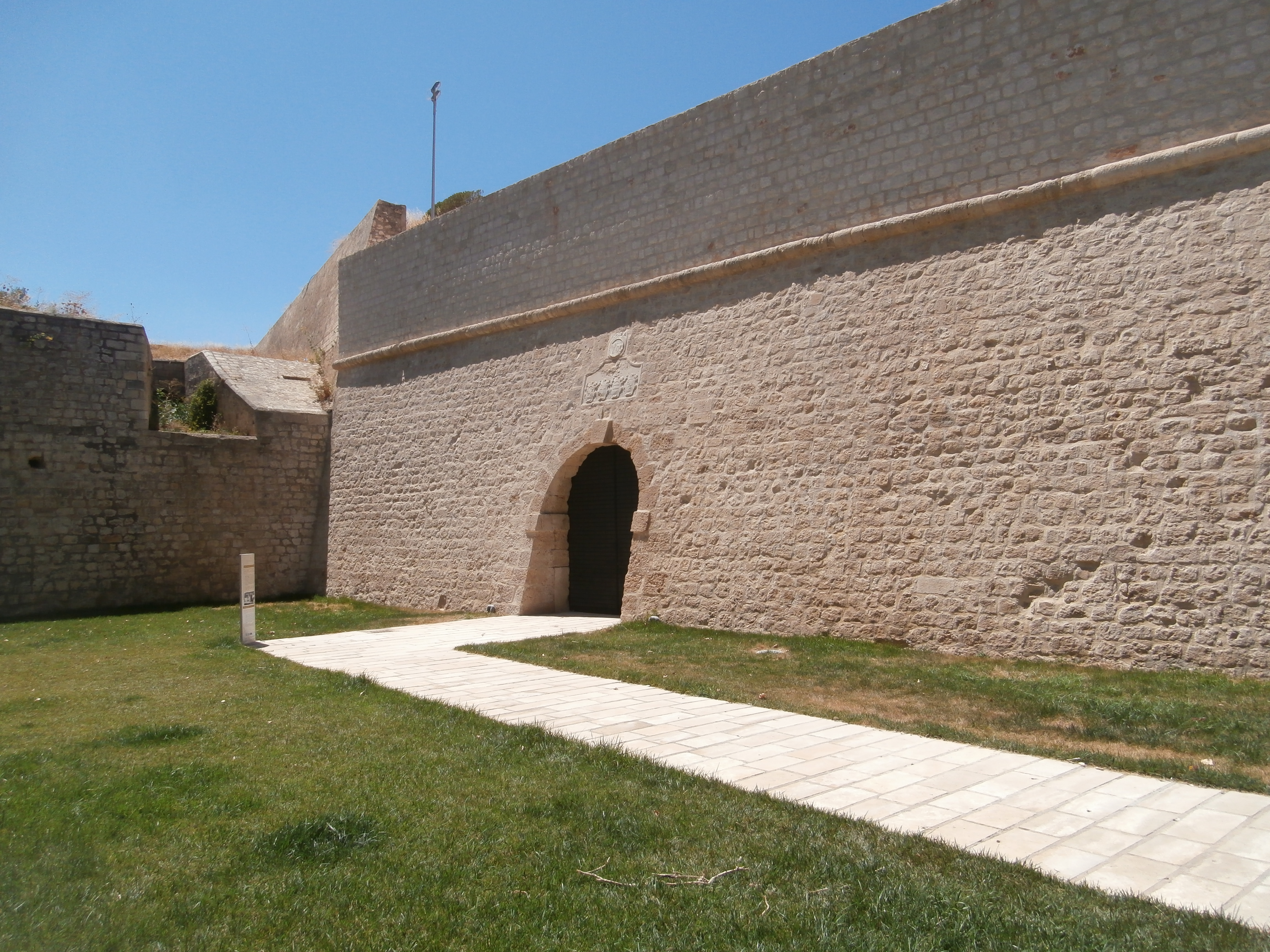
Jesus Gate, part of the Fortifications of Heraklion

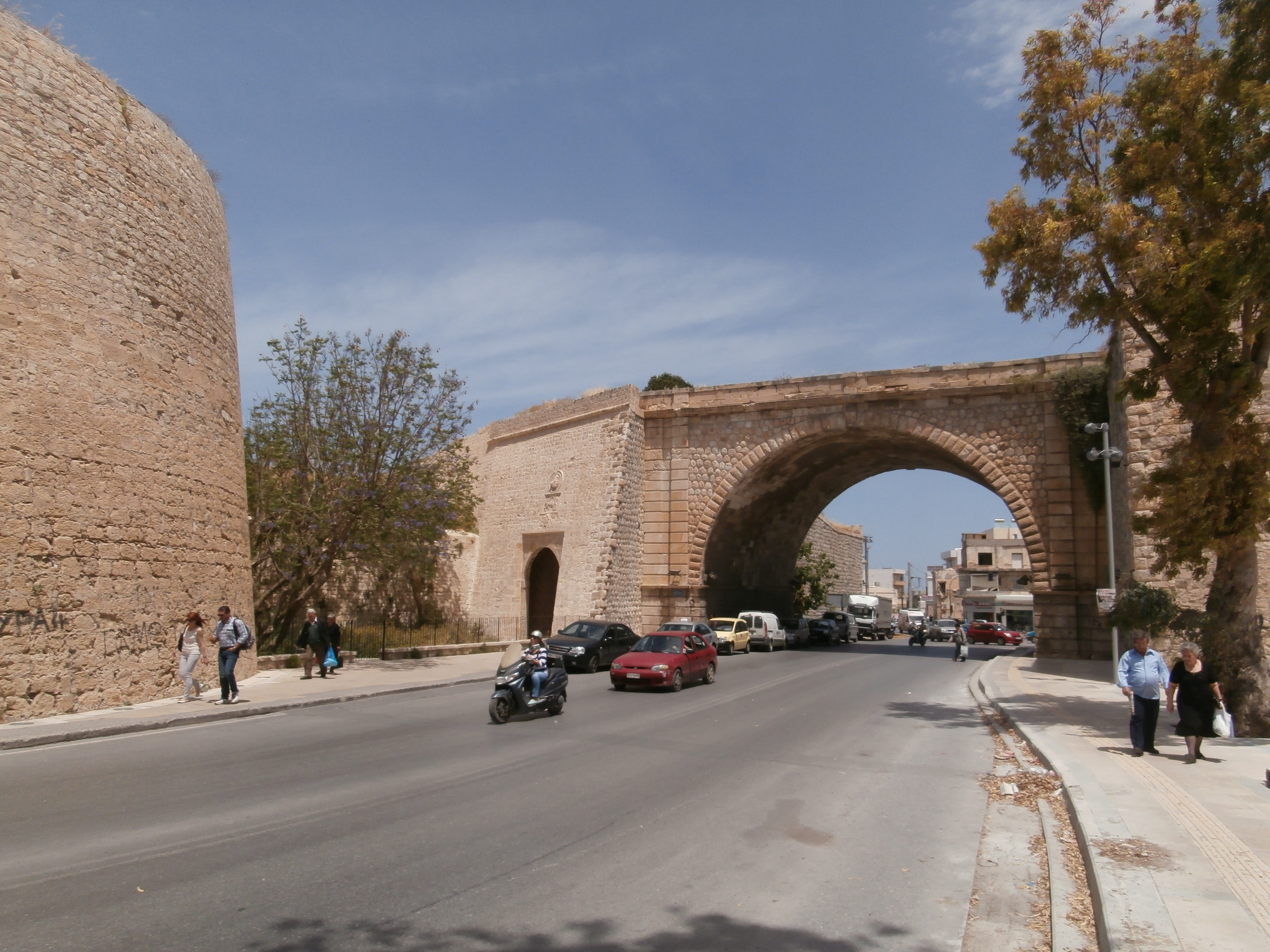
Chanioporta and Pantokratoras Gate

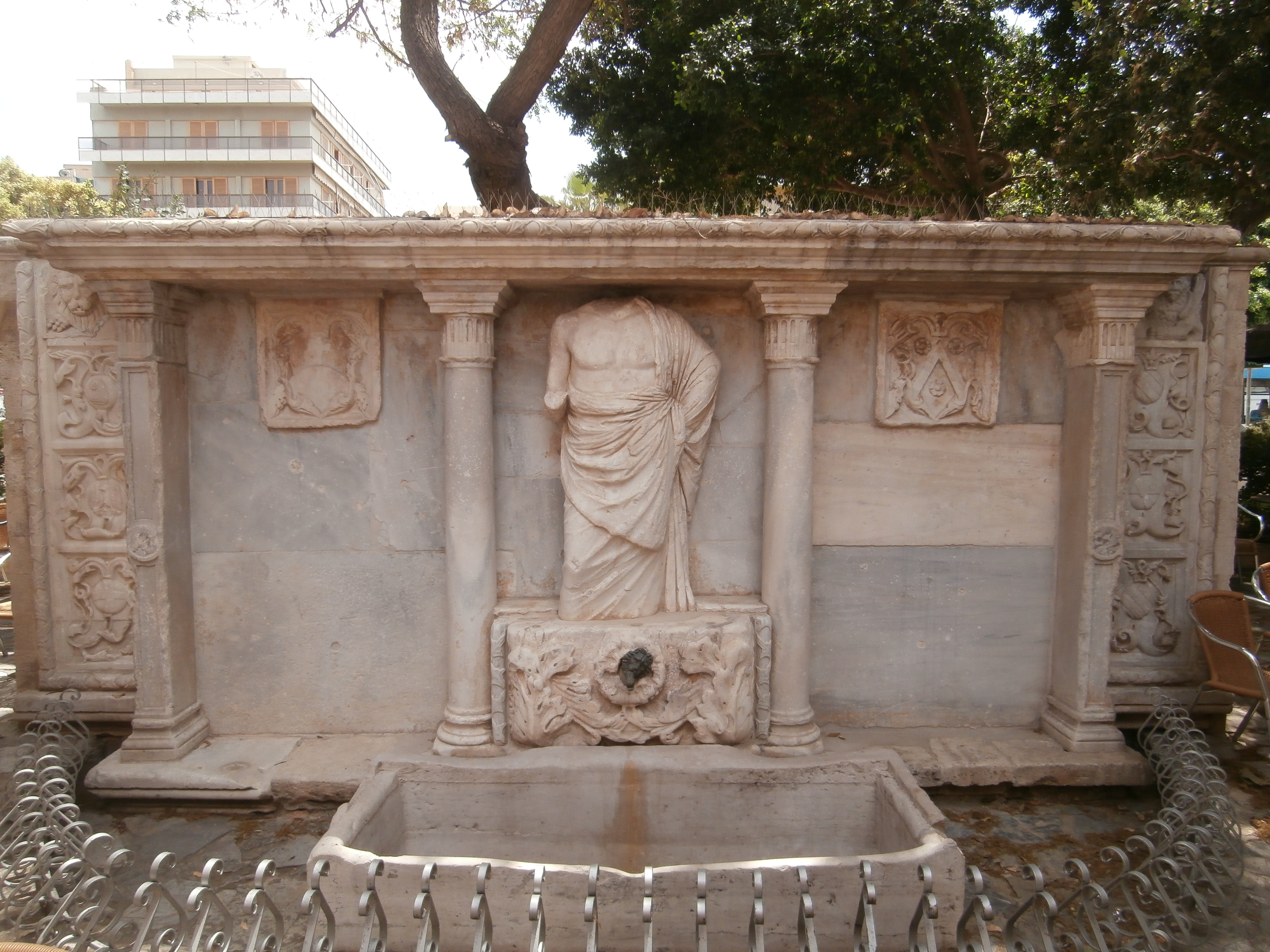
Bembo fountain

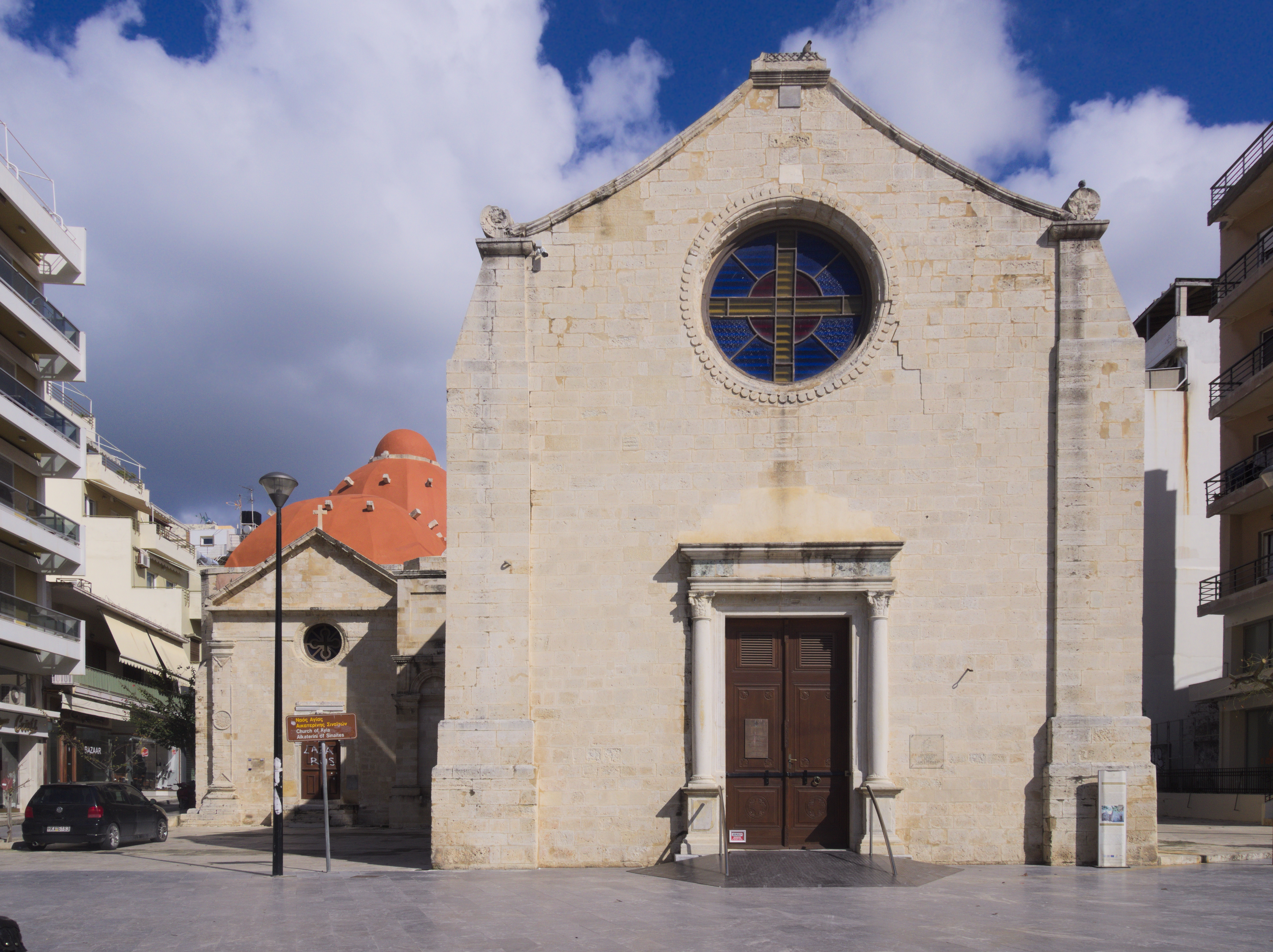
Saint Catherine Church

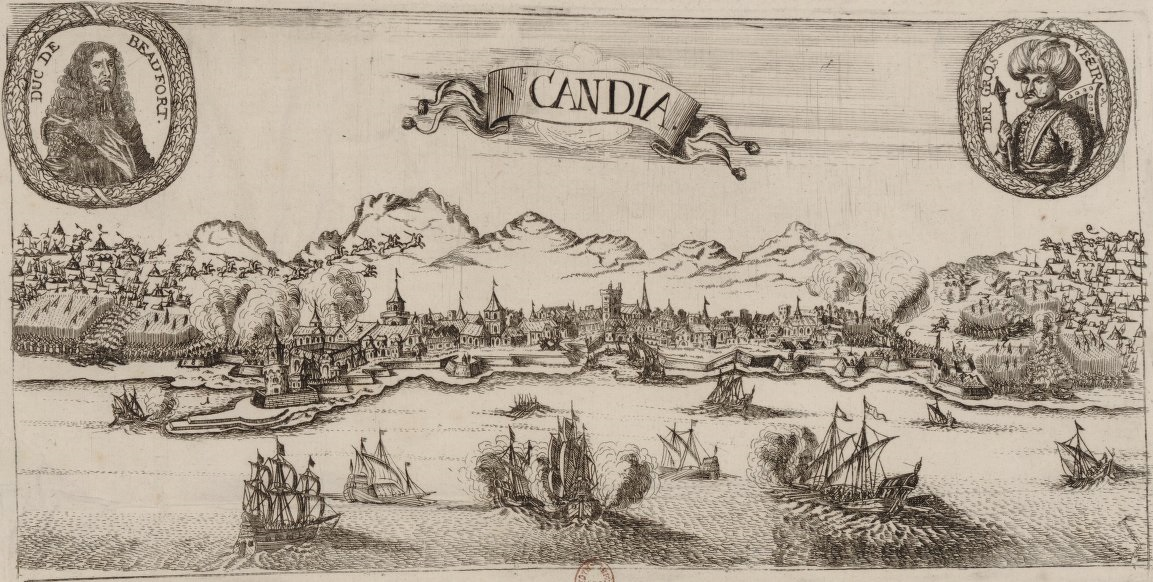
Depiction of the Siege of Candia

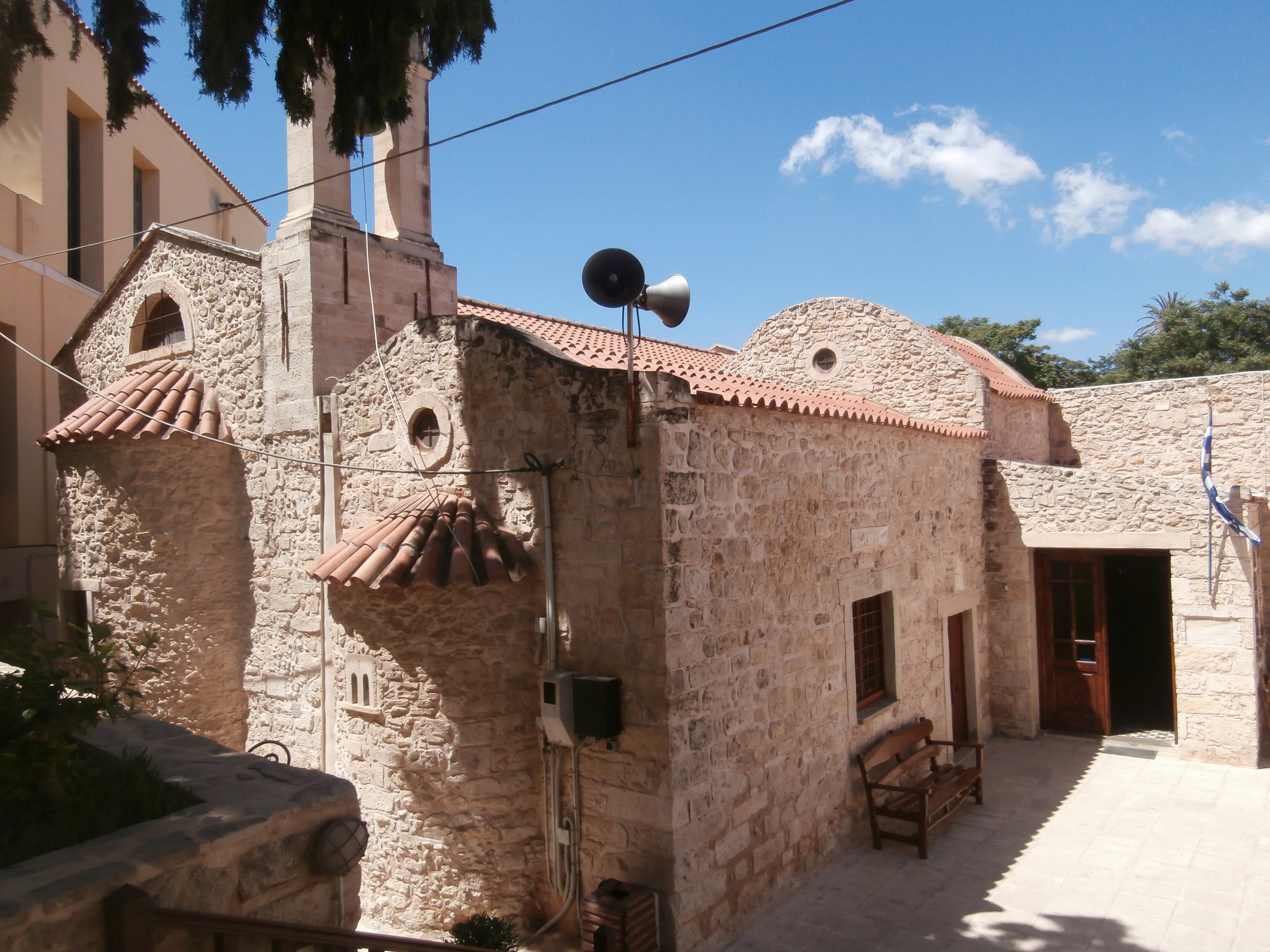
St. Matthew of the Sinaites Byzantine church

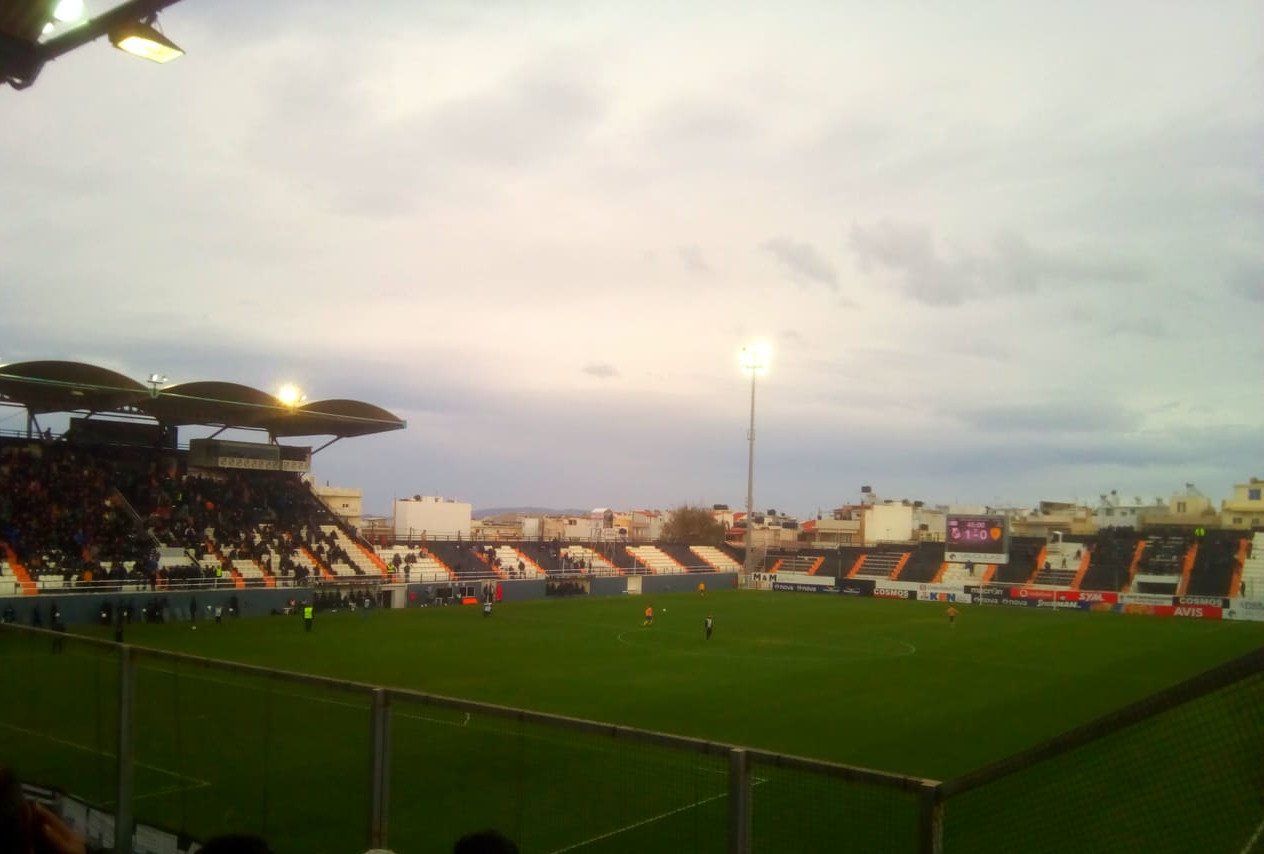
Theodoros Vardinogiannis Stadium, home ground of OFI

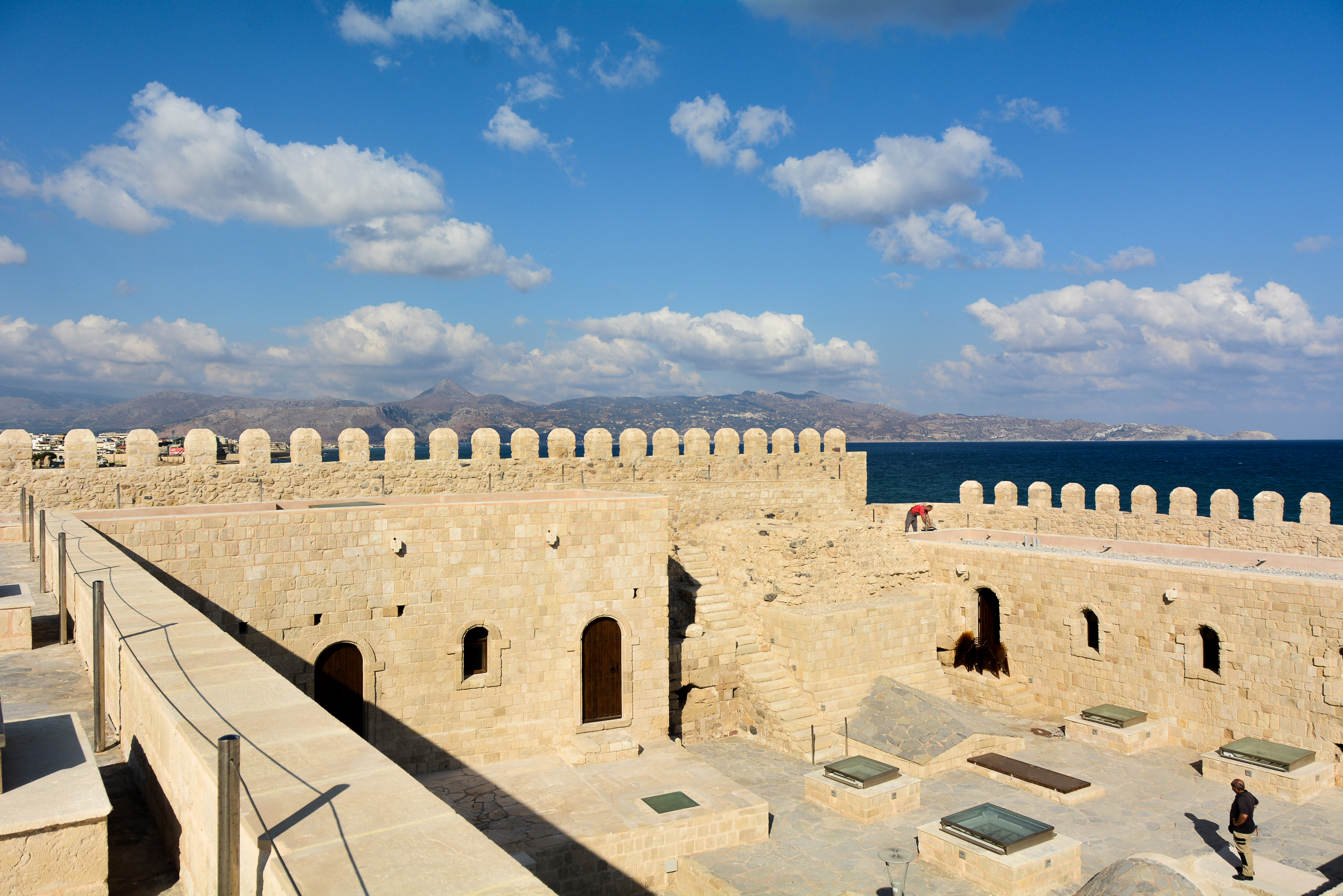
Interior of the Fortress

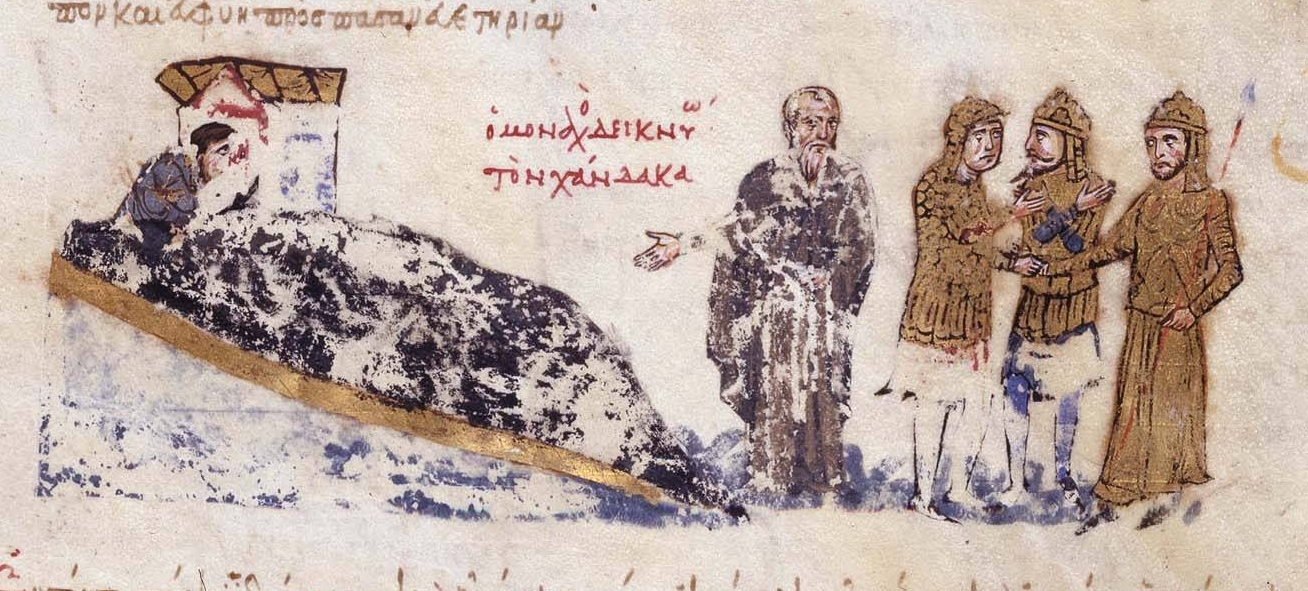
A monk shows the Saracens where to build Chandax

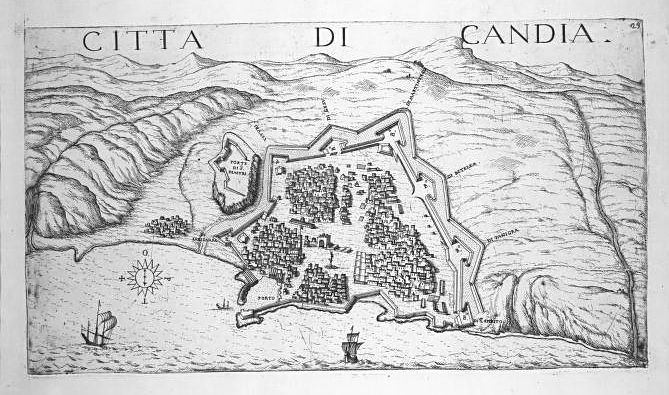
Map of Heraklion and its fortifications in 1651

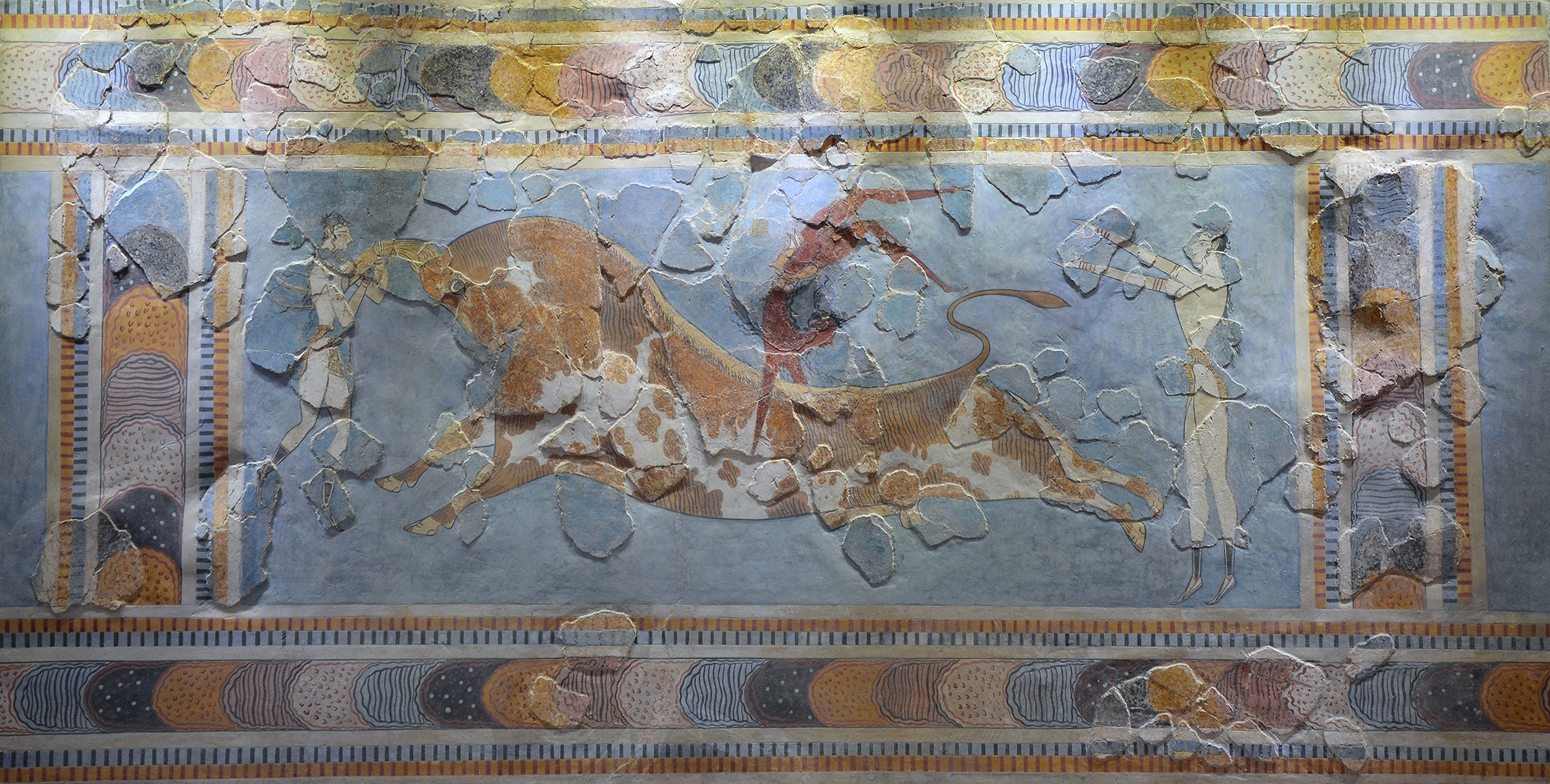
Minoan fresco depicting a bull leaping scene, found in Knossos, 1600-1400 BC, Heraklion Archaeological Museum

== See also ==
- Centre for Technological Research of Crete
- European Network and Information Security Agency
- Foundation for Research & Technology - Hellas
- Lions Square
- Minoan civilization
- Siege of Candia (1648–1669)
- TEI of Crete
