= Mirrors for princes =

Medieval educational literary genre for royals

Mirrors for princes or mirrors of princes (Latin: specula principum) are books that most frequently take the form of textbooks for the instruction of monarchs on successful governance and behavior. Authors often composed such "mirrors" at the accession of a new king, when a young and inexperienced ruler was about to come to assume power.

Mirrors constituted a literary genre of didactic political writings that were established in antiquity but increased in popularity throughout the Middle Ages and the Renaissance. It was part of the broader speculum or mirror literature genre.

The Latin term speculum principum appears as early as the 12th century and may have been used even earlier. It may have developed from the popular speculum literature popular from the 12th to 16th century, focusing on knowledge of a particular subject matter.

One of the earliest true writers on this genre is Sedulius Scottus (fl. 840–860), the Irish poet associated with the Pangur Bán gloss poem (c. 9th century). Prior to Sedulius, other writers merely touched on the idea, as "proto" writers of this genre. Possibly the best known European "mirror" is The Prince (c. 1513) by Niccolò Machiavelli, although this was not the most typical example.

== Antiquity ==
=== Sumer ===
- Instructions of Shuruppak (Early 3rd millennium BC)

=== Egypt ===
- Ptahhotep, The Maxims of Ptahhotep (2375–2350 BC)
- Kheti III, Teaching for King Merykara (c. 2000 BC)
- Kheti the Scribe, "Instructions of Amenemhat" (c. 1971 BC), a guide-poem on kingship for Senusret I, the son of the former Pharaoh Amenemhat I.
- Amenemope, Son of Kanakht, Instruction of Amenemope (c. 1100 BC)

=== Indian ===
- Vishnu Sharma, Panchatantra (Between 200 BC and 300 AD)
- Chanakya, Arthashastra (Between 200 BC and 300 AD)
- Narayan Pandit, Hitopadesha (c. 770 – 860 AD)

=== Greek and Roman ===
- Plato, Republic (375 BC)
- Xenophon, The Education of Cyrus (c. 370 BC)
- Aristotle, Politics (c. mid-4th century BC)
- Isocrates, To Nicocles and Evagoras
- Philodemus, The Good King According to Homer
- Dio Chrysostom, The First Discourse on Kingship, The Second Discourse on Kingship, The Third Discourse on Kingship, and The Fourth Discourse on Kingship
- Cicero, De Officiis (44 BC)
- Seneca, De Clementia (55–56 AD)
- Plutarch, Moralia (c. 100 AD)
- Pliny the Younger, Panegyric of Trajan (100 AD)
- Eusebius of Caesarea's Life of Constantine (c. 339 AD) may be a mirror for princes. This text's precise genre, audience, and aims has been a subject of scholarly controversy.
- Ambrose, De officiis ministrorum (c. 391 AD) – although the book is for clergy, many of its lessons can be applied to secular lords due to its inspiration and criticism of Cicero's original.
- Augustine of Hippo, The City of God, Book V, chapter 24, "The true felicity of Christian Emperors" (c. 413–426 AD)
- Salvian, De gubernatione Dei (439–451 AD)

== Western European texts ==
=== Early Middle Ages ===
- Martin of Braga, Formula vitae honestae, (570s AD) dedicated to Suebian King Miro of Galicia.
- Pope Gregory the Great, The Book of Pastoral Rule (590 AD) Although dedicated to clergy, lessons may also apply to nobles.
- Gregory of Tours' History of the Franks (late 6th century) which warns against internal strife.
- Isidore of Seville, The Sentenciae (620s AD), particularly book III.
- De duodecim abusivis saeculi, 'On the twelve abuses of the world' (7th century), a Hiberno-Latin treatise by an anonymous Irish author sometimes referred to as Pseudo-Cyprian. This work, though not a 'mirror for princes' per se, was to be of great influence on the development of the 'genre' as it took place on the Continent.

Carolingian texts. Notable examples of Carolingian textbooks for kings, counts and other laymen include:

- Cathwulf, Epistolae (775) written for Charlemagne.
- Paulinus of Aquileia, Liber exhortationis (795), for Count Heiric of Friuli.
- Alcuin, De virtutibus et vitiis (c. 799–800), written for Count Wido of Brittany.
- Smaragdus of Saint-Mihiel, Via regia (813), arguably the first true European mirror for princes, dedicated to Louis the Pious, when king of Aquitania.
- Einhard's Vita Karoli Magni (c. 814) which promotes Charlemagne's reign as something for other rulers to aspire to.
- Jonas of Orléans, De Institutione Laicali (818–828), (originally) written for Count Matfrid of Orléans.
- Jonas of Orléans, De Institutione Regia (c. 831), written for Pepin I of Aquitaine, apparently on the basis of a council at Orléans.
- Agobard of Lyons, his letters, A Comparison of Ecclesiastical and Political Government and Wherein the Dignity of the Church Outshines the Majesty of Empires and the Liber Apologeticus. (833 AD)
- Dhuoda, (841–843) Liber manualis, written for her son William.
- Sedulius Scottus, De rectoribus christianis 'On Christian rulers' (c. 855–9), addressed to King Lothar II of Lotharingia.
- Hincmar of Reims, De regis persona 'The Person of the King'
- Hincmar of Reims, De ordine palatii 'On the management of the palace' (882), which sets out the moral duties of a king and includes an account of the organisation of the palace.

Irish texts

- see De duodecim abusivis saeculi above. The vernacular mirrors differ from most texts mentioned here in that the ones who are described as giving and receiving advice are commonly legendary figures.
- Audacht Morainn ('The Testament of Morann'), written c. 700, an Old Irish text which has been called a forerunner of the 'mirrors for princes'. The legendary wise judge Morann Mac Máin is said to have sent advice to Feradach Finnfechtnach when the latter was about to be made King of Tara.
- Tecosca Cormaic, 'The Instructions of Cormac', in which the speaker Cormac mac Airt is made to instruct his son Cairbre Lifechair about a variety of matters.
- Bríatharthecosc Con Culainn 'The precept-instruction of Cúchulainn' (interpolated in Serglige Con Culainn), addressed to Lugaid Réoderg.
- Tecosc Cuscraid 'The instruction of Cuscraid'
- Senbríathra Fithail 'The ancient precepts of Fíthal'
- Briathra Flainn Fína 'The Sayings of Flann Fína'

=== High Middle Ages ===
- Stephen I of Hungary, Admonitions (1010s), written for his son and heir presumptive Saint Emeric.
- Hugh of Fleury, De Regia Potestate (1118/35), dedicated to King Henry I of England
- Moralium dogma philosophorum (c. 1150), dedicated to King Henry II of England
- Benoît de Sainte-Maure, Roman de Troie (1155-1160), written for nobles.
- John of Salisbury, Policraticus 'The Statesman's Book' (c. 1159).
- Godfrey of Viterbo, Speculum regum (c. 1183), dedicated to his Staufian imperial patrons, Frederick Barbarossa and his son Henry VI.
- Pseudo-Plutarch, Institutio Traiani (first quoted in John of Salisbury's Policraticus).
- Gerald of Wales, De principis instructione (c. 1191, circulated, after revisions c. 1216-1217)
- Gilles de Paris, Carolinus (c. 1200), dedicated to King Louis VIII of France.
- Helinand of Froidmont, De bono regimine principis, (1211 - 1223)
- Jean de Limoges, Somnium morale Pharaonis (c. 1234–60), written for Thibaut IV or Thibaut V
- Juan de Soria, Chronica latina regum Castellae (1239 AD) for use as a mirror for princes and to defend the rights of Castile against Leon.
- Konungs skuggsjá or Speculum regale, (c. 1250) Norwegian treatise originally written for King Magnús lagabœtir.
- Vincent of Beauvais, De eruditione filiorum nobilium = 'On the Education of Noble Children' (c. 1250).
- Guibert of Tournai, Eruditio regum et principum = 'The Education of Kings and Princes' (1259), written for Louis IX.
- Guibert of Tournai, De modo addiscendi = 'On the Method of Learning' (c. 1260) written for John de Dampierre, provost of Bruges, son of Guy of Flanders.
- Thomas Aquinas, De regno (c. 1260), often conflated with the De regimine principum of Ptolemy of Lucca
- Vincent de Beauvais, De morali principis institutione = 'On the Moral Instruction of the Prince' (c. 1262), probably written for Louis IX.
- William Peraldus, De eruditione principum = 'On the Education of Princes' (c. 1265), formerly attributed to Thomas Aquinas.
- Brunetto Latini, Li livres dou trésor (1266), written for Charles of Anjou.
- Giles of Rome, De regimine principum = 'On the Rule of Princes' (c. 1278), written for Philip the Fair.

=== Late Middle Ages ===
- Engelbert of Admont, Speculum virtutum moralium (c. 1310), written for Otto, Duke of Austria and Albert II, Duke of Austria
- Paolino Veneto, Trattato de regimine rectoris (1313×1315), written for the Marino Badoer, duke of Crete
- William of Pagula, Speculum regis, written for Edward III of England (c. 1331).
- Don Juan Manuel, Tales of Count Lucanor (1335).
- Don Juan Manuel, Libro Infinido o Libro de Castigos et de Consejos (1336–37)
- Alvarus Pelagius, Speculum regum (1340s), written for Alfonso XI of Castile.
- Um styrilsi kununga ok höfþinga (1350s), Old Swedish treatise
- The III Consideracions Right Necesserye to the Good Governaunce of a Prince (c. 1350), a translation of a French treatise from 1347, intended for King John II of France.
- Philip of Leyden, De cura reipublicae et sorte principantis ("On the care of the state and the role of the ruler") (c. 1355), dedicated to William V of Holland
- Evrart de Trémaugon, Le songe du verger (1376).
- Der Fürsten reget, (c. 1370–1380) dedicated to William, Duke of Austria
- Christine de Pizan, Epistre Othea a Hector (c. 1400), Livre du corps de policie (1407), Livre de la paix (between 1412 and 1414).
- Pierre Salmon, Dialogues (1409, rev. 1412/15), dedicated to Charles VI of France
- Thomas Hoccleve, De regimine principum (early 1410s) written for Henry V of England.
- Duarte of Portugal, Leal Conselheiro (1438), a practical manual of ethical guidance for the nobility of Portugal.
- Andreas Pannonius, Libellus de virtutibus Matthiae Corvino dedicatus (1467), dedicated to Matthias Corvinus, and Libellus de virtutibus Herculi Estensi dedicatus (1471), dedicated to Ercole I d'Este.
- John Ireland, The Meroure of Wysedome, (1490) written for James IV of Scotland.
- Phillipus de Bergamo, Spiegel der regyrunge (15th century) translated into middle German
- Eyn kurz ordenunge in gemeyne allen den die da regieren huß, dorffere oder stede, (15th century) short text written on how to rule a household, village or city
- Von der regeronge der stede, (15th century) text written on how to govern a city

=== Renaissance ===
- John Skelton, Speculum principis (1501), written for the future Henry VIII. A copy of this treatise, which may not be entirely the same as that presented to Henry, resides with the British Museum.
- Erasmus, Institutio principis Christiani 'Education of a Christian Prince' (1516), written as advice to King Charles of Spain (the later Charles V).
- Martin Luther. On Secular Authority (1523), a letter dedicated to John, Elector of Saxony
- Baldassare Castiglione's The Book of the Courtier (1528), based on experiences of the courts of Urbino.
- Antonio de Guevara, Relox de príncipes (1529), inspired by and dedicated to Charles V, a bestseller of its times, translated during the 16th century to English, Latin, Italian, German, French and Dutch.
- Justus Menius, Oeconomia christiana (1529), dedicated to Sibylle of Cleves for a right ordering of a Christian Lutheran household
- Machiavelli, Il Principe (c. 1513, published in 1532).
- George Buchanan, De iure regni apud Scotos (1579), a work in the form of a Socratic dialogue on ideal kingship dedicated to the young James VI of Scotland
- Giovanni Botero, The Reason of State (1589), a criticism of Machiavelli's Prince.
- Johann Damgaard, Alithia (1597), written for the young Danish monarch King Christian IV.
- Juan de Mariana, De rege et regis institutione (Toledo, 1598); The King and the Education of the King
- James VI of Scotland, Basilikon Doron (1599) written as a gift to his eldest son.
- Tomas Fernández de Medrano, República Mista (1602), dedicated to the 1st Duke of Lerma.
- Francisco de Quevedo, La política de Dios, y gobierno de Cristo (1617–1626) The Politics of God and the Government of Christ
- Hugo Grotius, De jure belli ac pacis (1625) dedicated to Louis XIII of France
- John Gauden, Eikon Basilike (1649) published after Charles I of England was beheaded.
- Diego Fernández de Medrano y Zenizeros, Mirror of Princes: Espejo de Príncipes: Crisol de sus Virtudes, Asombro de sus lealdades; Alma de su govierno y govierno de su Alma (1657–1661) Mirror of Princes: Crucible of his virtues, wonder of his loyalties; soul of his government and government of his soul, dedicated to Philip Prospero, Prince of Asturias.

=== Enlightenment ===
- John Locke, Some Thoughts Concerning Education (1693 AD)
- Jacques-Bénigne Bossuet, Politics Drawn from the Very Words of Holy Scripture (1709 AD) dedicated to the future Louis XV of France.
- Johann Gottfried Gregorii, Curieuse Affecten-Spiegel (1715 AD), particularly the chapter On the Christian Wisdom of Kings, Princes and Rulers
- Frederick II of Prussia, Anti-Machiavel (1740 AD) a critique of Machiavelli's Prince.
- Frederick II of Prussia, Letter addressed to his nephew, Charles Eugene, Duke of Württemberg (6 February 1744 AD)
- Montesquieu, The Spirit of Law (1748 AD)

=== Modern ===
- Walter Bagehot, The English Constitution (1867) studied by generations of British monarchs for its insight on their role in a constitutional monarchy.

== Byzantine texts ==
- Synesius, Bishop of Cyrene, De regno, speech delivered to emperor Arcadius.
- Agapetus the deacon, speech delivered to emperor Justinian I. (c. 530s)
- Basil I the Macedonian, Admonitory chapters I and II to his son emperor Leo VI the Wise
- Constantine VII Porphyrogennetos, De Administrando Imperio, a domestic and foreign policy manual for the use of Constantine's son and successor, the Emperor Romanos II. (948–952)
- Kekaumenos, Strategikon (1075/1078), chapters 77 – 91.
- Archbishop Theophylact of Ohrid, Paideia Basilike (Lat. Institutio Regia) (c. 1088), addressed to his pupil Constantine Doukas, son of Emperor Michael VII Doukas.
- Spaneas or Didaskalia Parainetike, modelled on the Isocratean Ad Demonicum (12th century)
- Nikephoros Blemmydes, Andrias Basilikos (Lat. Regia statua, "Statue of a King"), written for Theodore II Laskaris, the future Nicaean emperor (c. 1250)
- Thomas Magistros, La regalita addressed to Andronikos II Palaiologos. (14th century)
- Manuel II Palaiologos, Paideia Regia dedicated to his son, John VIII Palaiologos. (15th century)

== Pre-Islamic Persian texts ==
- Ewen-Nāmag ("Book of Rules"): On the Sasanian manners, customs, skills, and arts, sciences, etc. (Between 3rd and 7th century AD)
- Andarz literature. (Between 3rd and 7th century AD)

== Islamic texts ==
- Abd al-Hamid al-Katib, letter to Abdallah son of the Umayyad caliph Marwan II (c. 750)
- Ibn al-Muqaffa, Kalila wa Dimna (c. 750)
- Abu Yahya ibn al-Batriq (d. 815) Sirr al-Asrar (سر الأسرار) Secretum Secretorum
- Al-Farabi (c. 872–950), Fusul al-Madani 'Aphorisms of a Statesman'
- Abu'l-Qasim al-Husayn ibn Ali al-Maghribi (981–1027), Kitab fi'l-si'yasa
- Al-Tha'alibi (d. 1038), Ādāb al-mulūk
- Al-Mubashshir ibn Fatik (fl.1053, Damascus), Mukhtār al-Hikam wa-Maḥāsin al-Kalim (مختار الحكم ومحاسن الكلم) 'Selected Maxims and Aphorisms'
- Qabus nama (1082) – a Persian example of the genre
- Nizam al-Mulk, Siyāset-nāmeh 'Book of Government' (c. 1090) (Persian)
- Al-Imam al-Hadrami (d. 1095) – Kitâb al-Ishâra
- Al-Ghazali (1058–1111), Nasihat al-muluk 'Counsel to Princes' (Persian)
- Al-Ghazali (1105 AD/499AH), Alchemy of Happiness, Book XXI, Part Three, 'Disciplining the Self'
- Yusuf Balasaghuni, Kutadgu Bilig (11th century)
- At-Turtushi, Siraj al-Muluk 'The Lamp of Kings' (c. 1121)
- Ibn Ẓafar al-Ṣiqillī's (12th century) Sulwan al-Muta' fi 'udwan al-atba 'Consolation for the Ruler during the Hostility of Subjects'; published in English (1852) as, Solwān; or Waters Of Comfort
- Bahr Al-Fava'id 'Sea of (Precious) Virtues', compiled in the 12th century.
- Ibn Arabi, Divine Governance of the Human Kingdom (At-Tadbidrat al-ilahiyyah fi islah al-mamlakat al-insaniyyah) (1194–1201 AD/590-598AH)
- Saadi's Gulistan, chapter I, "The Manners of Kings", (1258, Persian).
- Wasitat al-suluk fi siyasat al-muluk
- Hussain Vaiz Kashifi's Aklhaq i Muhsini (composed in Persian AH 900/ AD 1495), translated into English as "The Morals of the Beneficent" in the mid 19th century by Henry George Keene
- Abd al-Wahhab al-Sha'rani (1540s AD/946AH) "Advice for Callow Jurists and Gullible Mendicants on Befriending Emirs"
- Lütfi Pasha Asafname (Mid-16th century)
- Muhammad al-Baqir Najm-I Sani, Mau‘izah-i Jahangiri 'Admonition of Jahāngír' or 'Advice on the art of governance' (1612–1613).

== Slavonic texts ==
- Patriarch Photios I of Constantinople, letter addressed to Boris I of Bulgaria (867 AD)
- Poucheniye (Instruction) of Vladmir Monomakh to his children (1120s).
- Izmaragd (c. 14th century) moral guide and education for children
- Patriarch Antony IV of Constantinople, letter to Vasily I of Moscow (1393).
- Domostroy (c. 15th century)
- Neagoe Basarab (1512–1521), The teachings of Neagoe Basarab to his son Theodosie, one of the earliest literary works in Wallachia
- Mikhail Lomonosov, (1760) Panegyric to the Sovereign Emperor, Peter the Great

== Chinese texts ==
=== Ancient ===
- Tao Te Ching – Lao Tzu Chinese philosopher (Can be interpreted as a mystical text, philosophical text, or political treatise on rulership) (late 4th century BC)
- Mencius – moral advice for a ruler (late 4th century BC)
- Han Fei Zi – Legalist text advice for a ruler and the art of statecraft (mid-3rd century BC) dedicated to Qin Shi Huang
- The Book of Lord Shang (Multiple authors spanning centuries, starting from c. 330 BC) text advice useful for a ruler and statecraft
- Shizi (c. 330 BC) particularly section 15, The Ruler's Governance

=== Imperial dynasties ===
==== Han dynasty ====
- Lu Jia (c. 200 BC) Xin Yu 新语 ("New Discourses"), treatise on why empires rise and fall.
- Ban Biao (c. 50 AD) Book of Han, Volume 23, Treatise on Punishment and Law
- Ban Biao (c. 50 AD) Treatise on the Mandate of Kings (王命論) covers the concept of sovereignty that would influence later Chinese texts.

==== Tang dynasty ====
- Ouyang Xun (624 AD) Yiwen leiju 藝文類聚 ("Classified collection based on the Classics and other literature")
- Kong Yingda (642 AD) Wujing Zhengyi 五經正義 ("Correct Meaning of the Five Classics")
- Liu Zhi (7th century AD) Zhengdian 政典 ("Manual of politics"), a political encyclopaedia useful for young boys taking the Imperial Examination

==== Song dynasty ====
- Ouyang Xiu (1060 AD) New Book of Tang, carries a treatise on how to select and appoint officials.
- Sima Guang (1084 AD) Zizhi Tongjian (Comprehensive Mirror in Aid of Governance)
- Zhu Xi (1172 AD) Zizhi Tongjian Gangmu
- Zheng Qiao (12th century) Tongzhi 通治 ("Comprehensive Treatise on Government")

==== Ming dynasty ====
- Zhu Yuanzhang (1373 AD) Huang-Ming Zuxun

==== Qing dynasty ====
- Huang Zongxi (1661–62 AD) Waiting for the Dawn

== In popular culture ==
- Mirrors For Princes is the name of a 2010 cinematic work by Lior Shamriz. Parts of the text were based on the Instructions of Shuruppak and other Sumerian literature.

== See also ==
- Conduct book
- Political science
- Treatise
