= Parliament of Scholars =

- Coined by: Huang Zongxi (1610–1695)
- Origin: Waiting for the Dawn
- Translator: Ted de bary (1919–2017)
- Essence: Confucian upper house

Parliament of Scholars (Chinese: 学者议会) is a term used by William Theodore de Bary in his translation of Huang Zongxi's Waiting for the Dawn, and Daniel A. Bell translated this term into "House of Scholars", which was later called the Xianshiyuan (literally, "House of Virtue and Talent").

The proposal to establish a "Parliament of Scholars", which is a Confucian upper house, was first put forward by Huang Zongxi. It is made up of representatives elected on the basis of competitive examinations from the Confucian classics, among other things.

== Evaluation ==
A Chinese scholar argued that Huang Zongxi's proposal for a Parliament of Scholars was only one step away from the modern representative system.
