= Gilles de Paris (disambiguation) =

Gilles de Paris (c. 1160–1223/4) was a French poet of the twelfth century.

Gilles de Paris may also refer to:

- Gilo of Toucy (died c. 1139–1142), cardinal-bishop of Frascati and poet
- Gilles de Corbeil (c. 1140–1224), French physician, practised in Paris
- Giles of Rome (c. 1243–1316), archbishop and author, educated at Paris
