= Aldine Press =

Venetian printing office

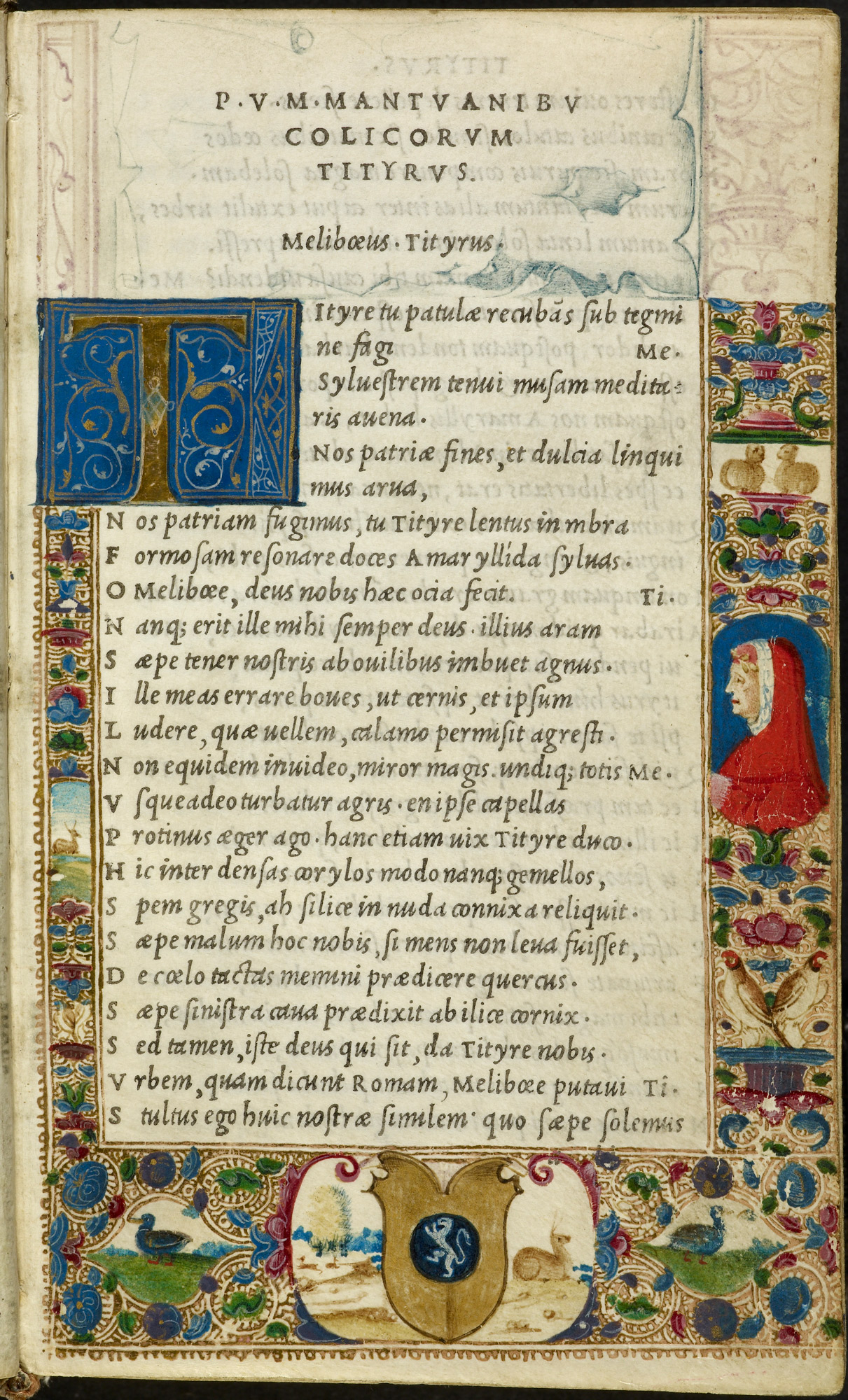
Page from the Aldine Vergil of 1501, the first of the standard octavo Aldines. British Library

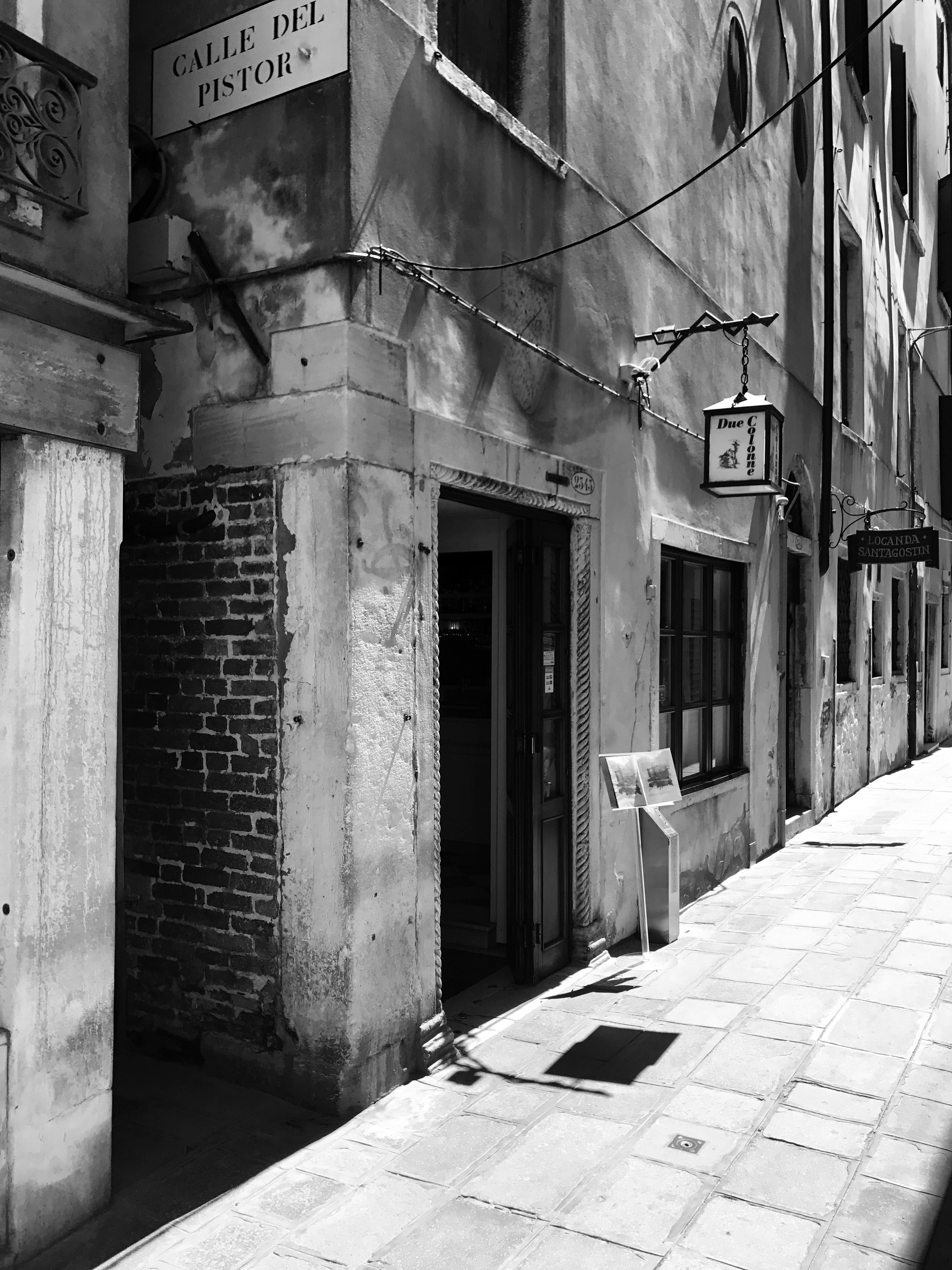
The true first location of the Aldine Press, civico numero 2343 Calle della Chiesa, San Polo on the campo Sant'Agostin, Venice

The Aldine Press was the printing office started by Aldus Manutius in 1494 in Venice, from which were issued the celebrated Aldine editions of the classics (Latin and Greek masterpieces, plus a few more modern works). The first book that was dated and printed under his name appeared in 1495.

The Aldine Press is famous in the history of typography, among other things, for the introduction of italics. The press was the first to issue printed books in the small octavo size, similar to that of a modern paperback, and intended for portability and ease of reading. According to Curt F. Bühler, the press issued 132 books during twenty years of activity under Aldus Manutius. After Manutius' death in 1515, the press was continued by his wife Maria and her father Andrea Torresani (Andrea Torresano), until Manutius' son Paulus (1512–1574) took over. His grandson Aldus Manutius the Younger then ran the firm until his death in 1597. Today, the antique books printed by the Aldine Press in Venice are referred to as Aldines, as are the letterforms and typefaces pioneered by the Aldine Press.

The press enjoyed a monopoly of works printed in Greek in the Republic of Venice, effectively giving it copyright protection. Protection outside the Republic was more problematic, however. The firm maintained an agency in Paris, but its commercial success was affected by many counterfeit editions, produced in Lyon and elsewhere.

The press also trained later Venetian printers. Among those who got their professional training under Manutius and Torresano were Torresano's sons Frederico and Franseco, and Giovanni Antonio Nicolini da Sabbio and his brothers who went on to found their own press as the fratelli da Sabbio.

== Beginnings ==
Aldus Manutius, the founder of the Aldine Press, was originally a humanist scholar and a teacher. Manutius met Andrea Torresani, who had acquired publishing equipment from the widow of Nicholas Jenson. The ownership of the press was originally split in two, with one half belonging to Pier Francesco Barbarigo, the nephew of Agostino Barbarigo, who was the doge at the time, and the other half belonging to Torresani. Manutius owned one fifth of Torresani's share of the press. Manutius was mainly in charge of the scholarship and editing, leaving financial and operating concerns to Barbarigo and Torresani. In 1496, Manutius established his own location of the press in a building called the Thermae in the Sestiere di San Polo on the campo Sant'Agostin in Venice, today numero civico (house number) 2343 San Polo on the Calle della Chiesa (Alley of the Church), now the location of the restaurant Due Colonne. Though there are two commemorative plaques located on the building numero civico 2311 Rio Terà Secondo, historians regard them to be erroneously placed based on contemporaneous letters addressed to Manutius. The first erroneous plaque had been placed by Abbot don Vincenzo Zenier in 1828.

Manutius lived and worked in the Thermae in order to produce published books from the Aldine Press. This was also the location of the "New Academy", where a group of Manutius' friends, associates, and editors came together to translate Greek and Latin texts. In 1505, Manutius married Maria, the daughter of Torresani. Torresani and Manutius were already business partners, but the marriage combined the two partners' shares in the publishing business. After the marriage, Manutius lived at Torresani's house. Shrinking in popularity, in 1506 the Aldine Press was moved to Torresani's house in the parish of San Paternian. It was later demolished in 1873 and was covered by a bank building in the Venice square, Campo Manin.

== Accomplishments ==
The press was started by Manutius due to a combination of his love of classics and the need for preservation of Hellenic studies. During its initial era, the press printed new copies of Plato, Aristotle, and other Greek and Latin classics.

The first edition of Plato's works (known as the Aldine edition) was dedicated to Pope Leo X and included the poem of Musurus and the life of Plato by Diogenes Laertius, which were also included in the first two editions of Plato's works printed in Basel. The two Basel editions were introduced by a Latin preface written by the German humanist Simon Grynaeus, a scholar of Greek, who dedicated the work to the humanist Thomas More.

Manutius also printed dictionaries and grammars to help people interpret the books, used by scholars wanting to learn Greek, who would employ learned Greeks in order to teach them directly. Historian Elizabeth Eisenstein claims that the fall of Constantinople in 1453 had placed under threat the importance and survival of Greek scholarship, but that publications such as those by the Aldine Press secured it once more. Erasmus was one of the scholars learned in Greek with whom the Aldine Press partnered in order to provide accurately translated text. The Aldine Press also expanded into modern languages, mainly Italian and French.

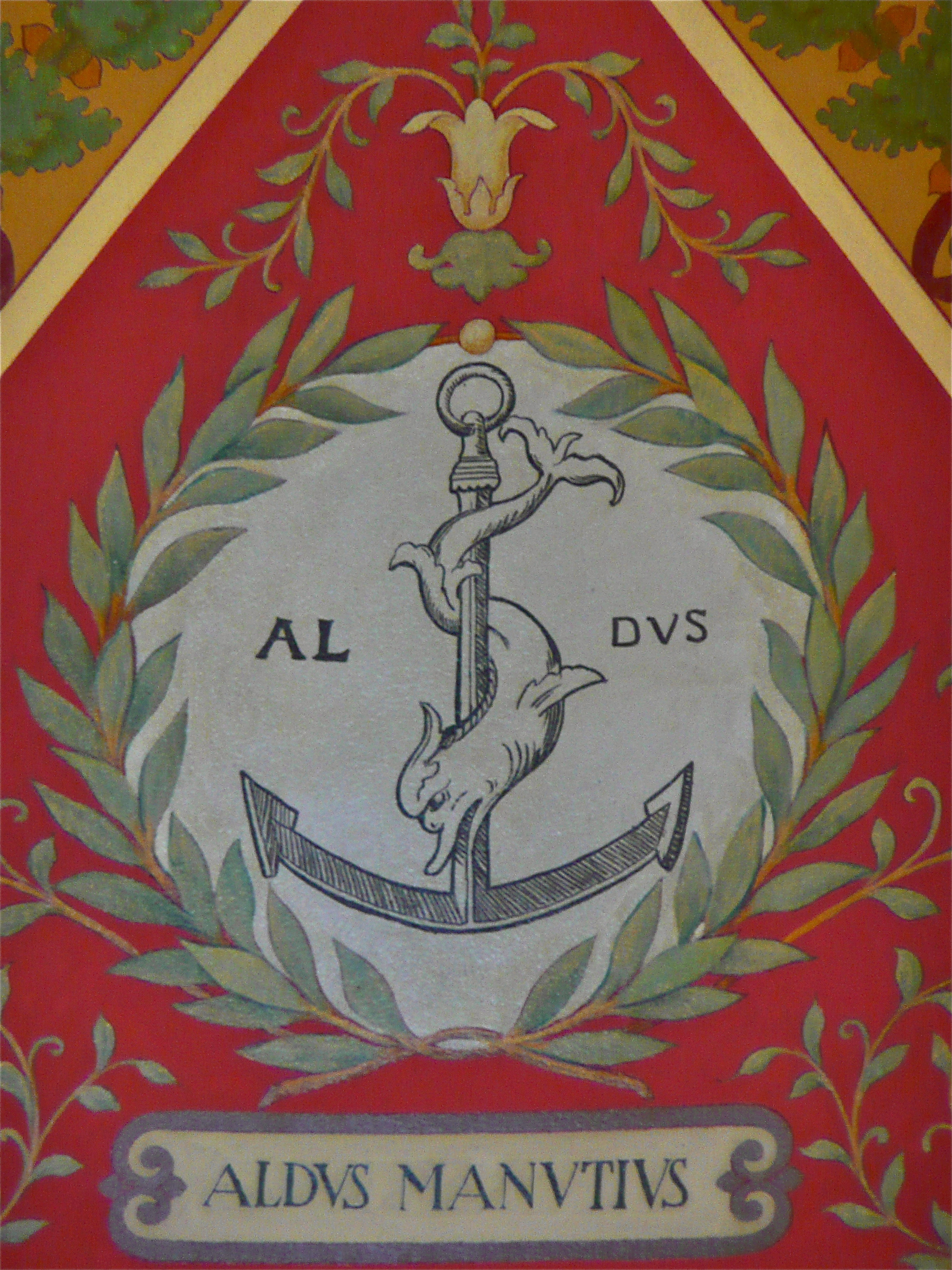
Aldus Manutius device commemorated in the Library of Congress, Washington D.C.

=== Humanist typefaces ===
Manutius eventually took on a project to improve upon the Humanistic font designs of Jenson's typefaces, hiring Francesco Griffo to design and cut typefaces for his print editions of classical literature. Humanistic fonts, based on the formal hand of Renaissance humanist scribes and notaries, had been in development from the time movable print arrived in Italy, notably by the French printer Nicolas Jenson in 1470. Griffo developed his own further refinements of style, resulting in one of the earliest roman typefaces produced. Griffo's earliest roman type first appeared in February 1496 in Pietro Bembo's De Aetna; the design was revived by the Monotype Corporation in 1928-29 as the typeface Bembo, still in use today. The same book is also credited with the first printed use of the semicolon.

=== Italic typeface ===
Adapting this admired and influential roman-faced font, Manutius and Griffo went on to produce a cursive variant, the first of what is now known as italic type. The word italic is derived from early Italian versions of italic faces, which were designed primarily in order to save on the cost of paper. The Aldine Press first used italic type in a woodcut of Saint Catherine of Siena in 1500. Their 1501 edition of Virgil's Opera was the first book to be printed in italic type. The roman typeface and italic form created and pioneered by Manutius and Griffo were highly influential in typographic development.

=== Portable books (or libelli portatiles) ===
Beginning in 1505, Manutius produced plain texts in a portable form, using the term enchiridion, meaning "handbook" (later misnamed "pocketbook"). The octavo was the first version of the editio minor. Although these new, portable books were not cheap, the books of the Aldine Press did not force upon their buyers a substantial investment comparable to that of large volumes of text and commentary during this era. These books consisted on an edited text issued without commentary, printed in a typeface mimicking chancery script (the cursive handwriting of the humanist), produced in a small book which could sit comfortably in the hand. The editio minor, in many ways, brought financial and logistical benefits to those interested in the classics. An individual no longer had to go to the book, but rather the book came along with them.

=== Imprint and motto ===
In 1501, Aldus used as his publisher's device the image of a dolphin wrapped around an anchor. "The dolphin and anchor device owed its origins most immediately to Pietro Bembo. Aldus told Erasmus six years later that Bembo had given him a silver coin minted under the Roman Emperor Vespasian bearing an image of this device. The image of the dolphin and anchor on the coin came with the saying "Festina Lente", meaning "make haste slowly." This would later become the motto for the Aldine Press.

== After 1515 ==
Manutius died on February 6, 1515. Following his death, the firm was run by Torresani and his daughter Maria, the widow of Manutius. The name of the press was changed in 1508 to "In the House of Aldus and Andrea Torresano," and kept this name until 1529. In 1533, Paulus Manutius managed the firm, starting it up again and changing its name to "Heirs of Aldus and Andrea Torresano". In 1539, the imprint changed to "Sons of Aldo Manuzio". In 1567, Aldus Manutius the Younger (grandson of Aldus Manutius) took over and maintained the business until his death.

== Publications ==
A partial list of publications from the Aldine Press, cited from Aldus Manutius: A Legacy More Lasting than Bronze.

- Musarum Panagyris, Aldus Manutius, sometime between March 1487 and March 1491.
- Erotemata cum interpretatione Latina, Constantine Lascaris, 8 March 1495.
- Opusculum de Herone et Leandro, quod et in Latinam Linguam ad verbum tralatum est, Musaeus, before November 1495 (Greek text) and 1497–98 (Latin text).
- Dictionarium Graecum, Johannes Crastonus, December 1497.
- Institutiones Graecae grammatices, Urban Valeriani, January 1497.
- Rudimenta grammatices latinae linguae, Aldus Manutius, June 1501.
- Poetae Christiani veteres, June 1502.
- Institutionum grammaticarum libri quatuor, Aldus Manutius, December 1514.
- Suda, February 1514.

Works published from the Greeks. Manutius printed thirty editiones principes of Greek texts, allowing these texts to escape the fragility of the manuscript tradition.

- Eclogae triginta..., Theocritus, February 1496.
- Theophrastus de historia plantarum..., Aristotle, 1 June 1497.
- De mysteriis Aegyptiorum, Chaldaeorum, Assyriorum..., Iamblichus, September 1497.
- Aristophanis Comoediae novem, Aristophanes, 15 July 1498.
- Omnia opera Angeli Politiani..., Angeloa Ambrogini Poliziano, July 1498.
- Herodoti libri novem quibus musarum indita sunt nomina, Herodotus, September 1502.
- Omnia Platonis opera, Plato, May 1513.
- Oratores Graeci, May 1513.
- Deipnosophistae, Athenaeus, August 1514.

Latin works

- Scriptores astronomici veteres, Firmicus Maternus, 17 October 1499.
- Petri Bembi de Aetna ad Angelum Chabrielem liber, Pietro Bembo, February 1496.
- Diaria de Bello Carolino, Alessandro Benedetti, 1496 (the first published work of the Aldine Press using the humanist typeface).
- Libellus de epidemia, quam vulgo morgum Gallicum vocant, Niccolò Leoniceno, June 1497.
- Hypnerotomachia Poliphili, Francesco Colonna, December 1499.
- Epistole devotissime de Sancta Catharina da Siena, St. Catherina of Siena, 19 September 1500.
- Opera, Publius Vergilius Maro (Virgil), April 1501.
- Opera, Quintus Horatius Flaccus (Horace), May 1501.
- Rhetoricorum ad C. Herennium...libri, Marcus Tullius Cicero, (Cicero) March 1514.

Libelli Portatiles

- Le cose volgari de Messer Francesco Petrarcha, Francesco Petrarca (Petrarch), July 1501.
- Opera, Catullus, Tibullus, and Propertius, January 1502.
- Epistolae ad familiares, Marcus Tullius Cicero (Cicero), April 1502.
- Le terze rime, Dante Alighieri, August 1502.
- Pharsalia, Marcus Annaeus Lucanus (Lucan), April 1502.
- Tragaediae septem cum commentariis, Sophocles, August 1502.
- Tragoediae septendecim, Euripides, February 1503.
- Fastorum...libri, de tristibus..., de ponto, Publius Ovidius Naso (Ovid), February 1503.
- Florilegium diversorum epigrammatum in septem libros, Greek Anthology, November 1503.
- Opera, Homer, sometime after 31 October 1504.
- Urania sive de stellis, Joannes Jovianus Pontanus, May & August 1505.
- Vita, et Fabellae Aesopi..., Aesop, October 1505.
- Epistolarum libri decem, Gaius Plinius Caecilius Secundus, November 1508.
- Commentariorum de Bello Gallico libri, Gaius Julius Caesar, December 1513.
- Odes, Pindar, January 1513.
- Sonetti et Canzoni. Triumphi, Francesco Petrarca (Petrarch), August 1514.

=== Archives ===
The most nearly complete collection of Aldine editions ever brought together was originally housed in the Althorp library of the 2nd Earl Spencer, and is now in the John Rylands Library, Manchester.

In North America, the most substantial Aldine holdings can be found in the Ahmanson-Murphy Aldine Collection at the University of California, Los Angeles, the Harry Ransom Center at University of Texas at Austin, and the Harold B. Lee Library at Brigham Young University.
