= Giovanni Antonio Nicolini da Sabbio =

Venetian printer and publisher (c. 1500–1547)

Giovanni Antonio Nicolini da Sabbio (c. 1500–1547) founded the Nicolini press with his brothers which became one of the most active Venetian printing houses. The press produced works in Latin, Greek, as well as vernacular Italian and Spanish. Their works included new translations of Homer, a new edition of Dante and even practical work such as a book on embroidery.

== Early life ==
Giovanni Antonio Nicolini da Sabbio was born in Sabbio Chiese in Lombardy around end of fifteenth century.

Sabbio Chiese was one of the principal papermaking centres supplying the Venetian book trade. By the early 1600s a cohort of printing families had begun to operate in the city, who were commented at the time to be "excellently practiced in every language, and every nation and were famous and valuable to all the writers of the world".

Turrino Nicolini and his six sons, Giovanni Antonio (the eldest) Stefano, Pietro, Giacomo, Ludovico, and Giovanni Maria had worked at the paper mills of Toscolano on Lake Garda.

Using his father's contacts in Venice, Giovanni Antonio moved to Venice, probably with his brothers Stefano and Pietro where they were known by the toponym da Sabbio.

== In the Aldine workshop ==
By the 16th century, Venice’s printing industry was the largest in Europe. In Venice, the Aldine Press (an enetreprise set up by Andrea Torresano and his son-in-law Aldus Manutius) had been set up to print Greek and Latin texts. They had already built up a network of commercial contact and printing operations and the Nicolini brothers joined their workshop. In this family printing establishment Giovanni Antonio and his brother learned the printing trade.

== As an independent press ==
Fig 1. Printer's device of the Nicolini da Sabbio brothers.

The first concrete evidence for Giovanni Antonio's activity outside the Aldine press comes from a Venetian Senate privilege granted in 1521 The request was made in the name of: "maestro Antonio da Sabio e fratelli stampatori" ("Master Antonio da Sabbio and his brothers, printers"). By then the evidence is that has was now in charge of a printing office that was probably located in the premises he shared with his brothers.

Giovanni Antonio worked as the master printer, while Stefano was working under him as the type-setter. (Some authorities claim this was as earlier as 1512, but this is almost certainly an error)

The brothers did not use the family surname Nicolini in their imprints. Instead they became known simply as, "i fratelli da Sabbio" ("the brothers from Sabbio"). Their device was a cabbage plant (brassica) entwined by a dragon or serpent which bore the inscription "Io. Ant. et Fres. de Sabio" ("Giovanni Antonio and brothers of Sabbio").(Fig 1)

== Greek printing enterprise ==
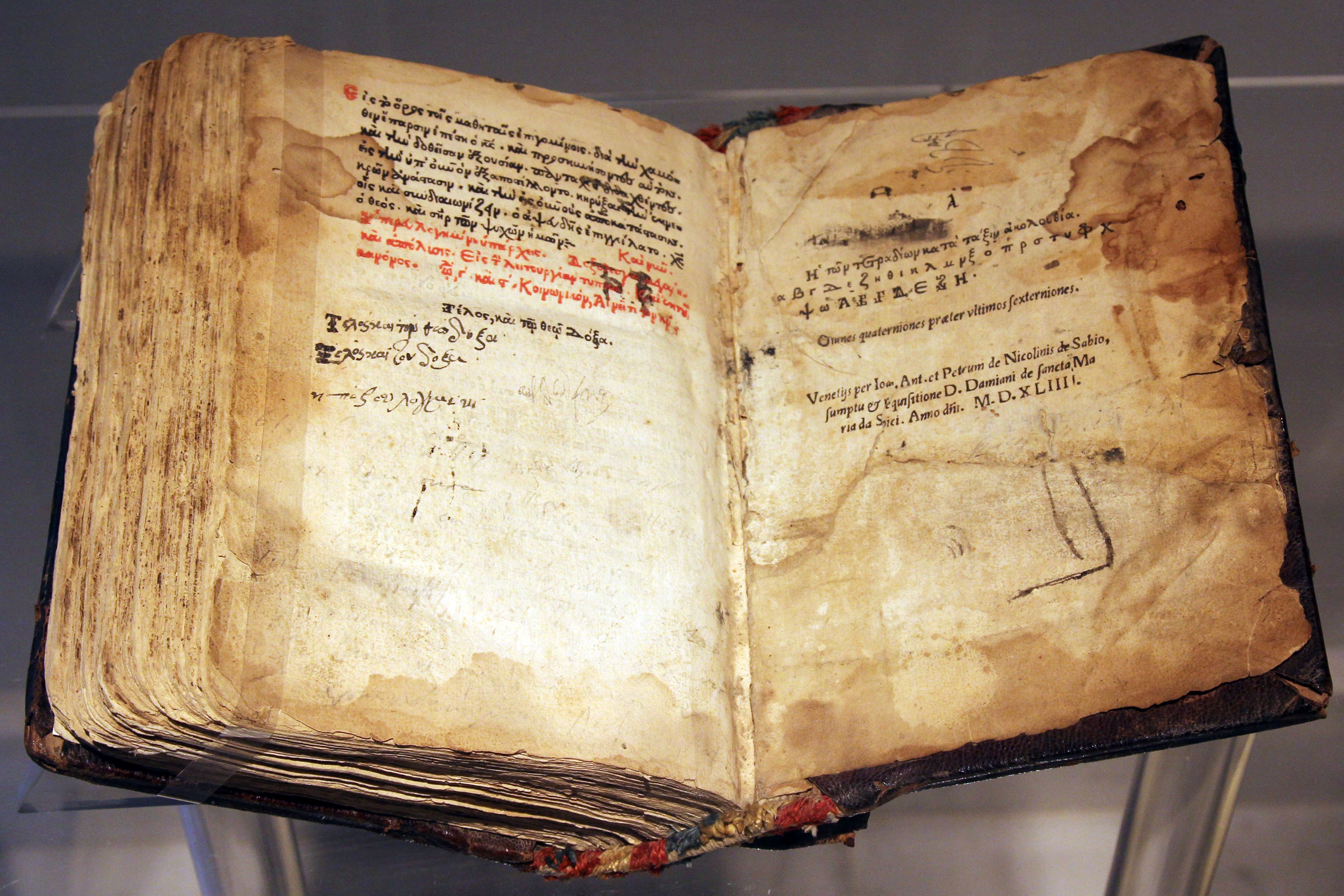
Fig 2. Title page of the 1544 Pentecostarion printed by the Nicolini da Sabbio brothers.

Around 1520, a Greek merchant from Patras, Andreas Kunadis (also known as Andrea Cunadis) also joined the Aldine press as an apprentice where he met the de Sabbio brothers. They decided to establish a printing house for new translations of the classics in contemporary Greek. So, Giovanni Antonio and Stefano moved to the parish of San Fantin, where they operated under Kunadis's direction and financial backing, and set up a press devoted to Greek books. The first book was a Psalter, printed in 1521.

Giovanni Antonio managed the press and Stefano handled composition (typesetting) and the commercial side. They recruited Dimitrios Zinos, a young Greek scholar to correct proofs and to work as a translator and manuscript copyist.

Kunadis died in 1523, and the publishing house passed to his father-in-law Damiano di Santa Maria who continued the firm's production with the da Sabbio brothers, Giovanni and Stefano.

In 1527, Stefano Nicolini da Sabbio printed Nikolaos Lukanis' translation of the Iliad into modern Greek. The edition was adorned by 138 woodcuts that were used to illustrate editions of vernacular Greek . It was the first printed edition of the Iliad in a contemporary language, previous editions had all been in classical Greek.

They also printed many literary works of contemporary Cretan literature, which was undergoing a renaissance at the time, for example the History of Tagiapiera (1523) a chronicle lauding the valour of a Venetian captain in the liberation of Corfu from the Turks in 1520, by Iakovos Trivolis.

By producing classical works such as the Iliad, liturgical works such as the Typikon and contemporary vernacular accounts (as above) the Nicolini press could claim to be an important contributor to Greek printing in Venice.

== Spanish Market ==
The brothers played a role in the dissemination of Spanish language literature in Venice. They went into partnership with a bookseller, Juan Bautista Pederzano and they produced new editions of popular Spanish works. They printed major works such as Cárcel de amor (by Diego de San Pedro) , La Celestina and Amadís de Gaula. This was the first vernacular Spanish leisure literature printed in Venice.

The editor of the texts, Francisco Delicado, added linguistic material intended to help Italians read Spanish. This suggests that this was not just directed at expatriate Spaniards, but at Venetians who wanted to explore Spanish literature, showing the growing prestige of Spanish as a literary language in sixteenth-century Europe.

== Growth of the Business ==
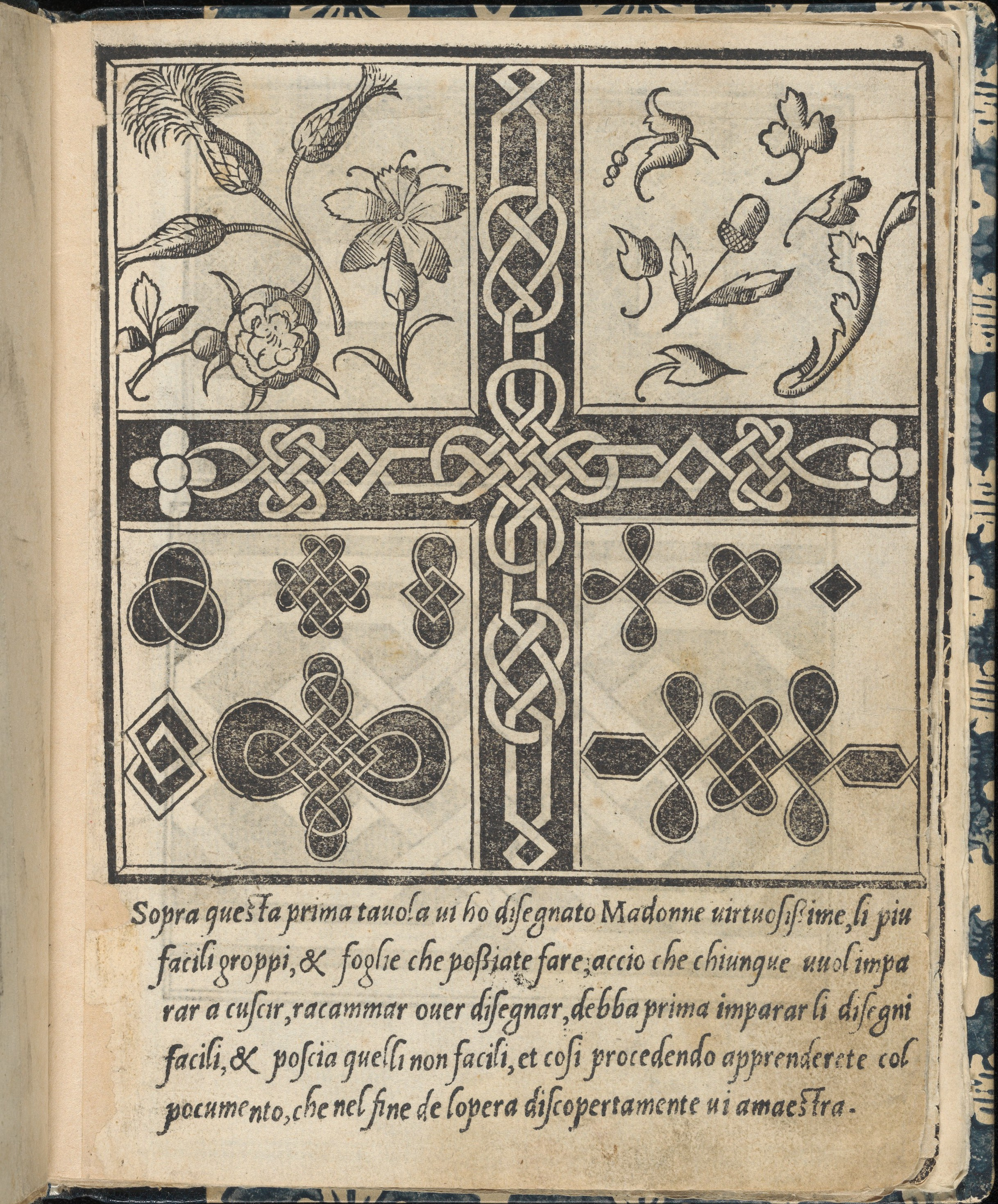
Fig 3. Page from Essempio di recammi (1527), an embroidery pattern book printed by Giovanni Antonio Nicolini da Sabbio and his brothers.

By 1527 the brothers had moved their residence to Campo Sant'Angelo, renting a house from the powerful Contarini family. Giovanni Antonio led the family enterprise during its most successful years between 1533 and 1539.

Their business was prospering, largely through Stefano's commercial and intellectual connections. Only a few years after establishing the San Fantin press, Stefano expanded operations by opening an additional workshop in the nearby parish of Santa Maria Formosa, while Giovanni Antonio and Pietro continued printing at San Fantin.

The brothers worked together until 1528, when Stefano moved to Verona at the invitation of Bishop Gian Matteo Giberti to help with his new publishing programme. The Bishop wanted to improve the standard of ecclesiastical knowledge and he had set up a printing press in his own palace which turned out numerous editions of the Greek Fathers, notably John Chysostom and John Damascene.

The enterprise in Verona turned out to be less profitable than they had hoped, and after printing just a dozen books Giovanni Antonio, Stefano and Pietro left Verona in 1532, and resumed publishing in Venice both jointly and independently. Giberti continued to use their Venetian workshop.

In 1542, Stefano left for Rome, where he joined the printing establishment of Antonio Blado and participated in plans for a Greek press sponsored by the future Pope Marcellus II (Marcello Cervini). Giovanni Antonio remained active in Venice.

== Death and Aftermath ==
Giovanni Antonio died in Venice between late 1546 and early 1547. He requested burial in the church of San Angelo in Venice. After his death, his brother Stefano stayed in Rome until 1564 but the Venetian branch of the family business declined. The Nicolini family continued printing in Venice until the early eighteenth century through their descendants. In Brescia the name Sabbi continued until the 1650s, when the business was acquired by the Turlini Family. The final book published by the Dynasty and which featured their name and mark was Brescia Antica, by Giovanni Battista Nazari in 1658.

== Selected Works ==
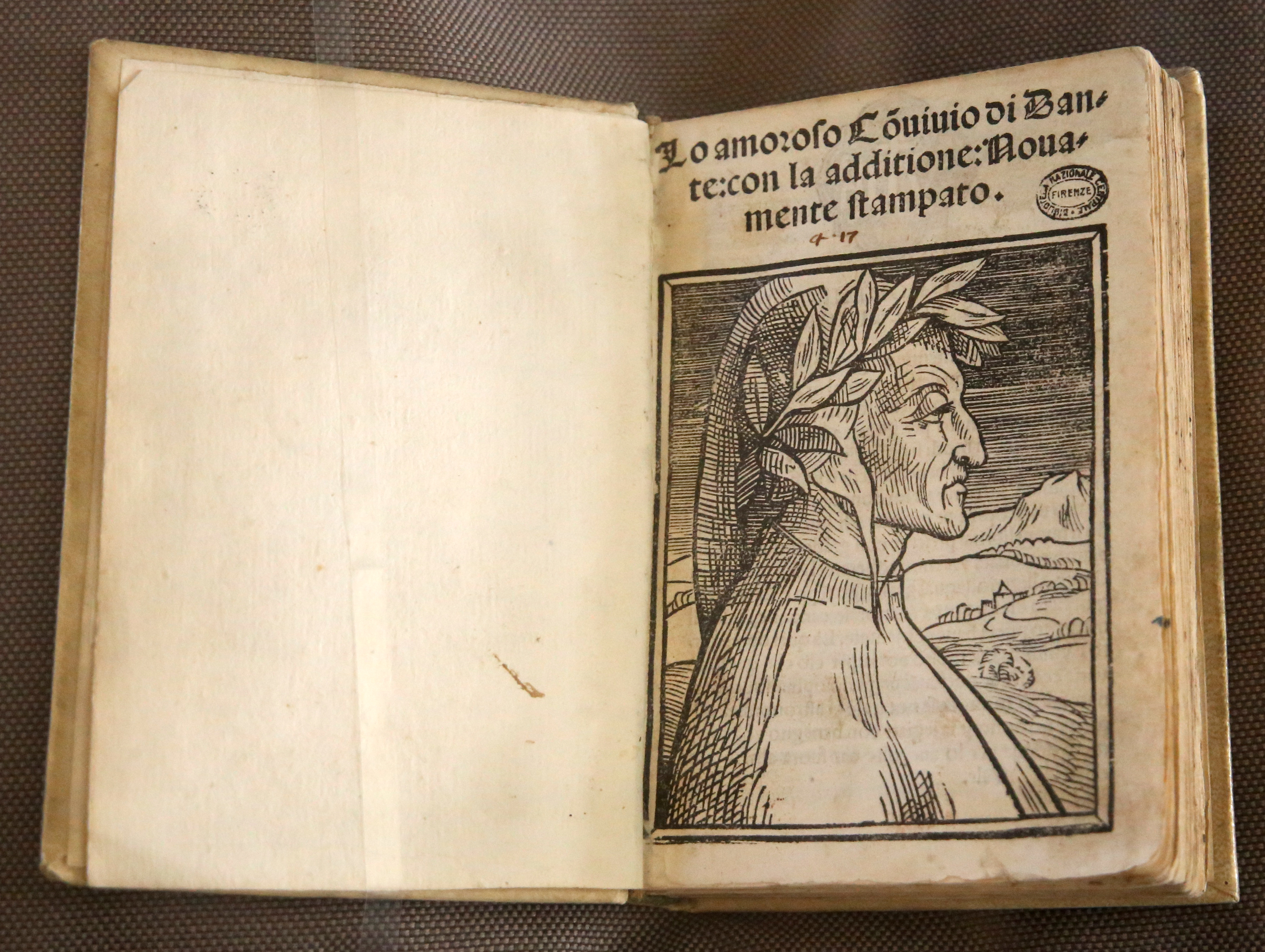
Fig 4. Nicolini brothers' Convivio, including a woodcut of Dante

Nicolini and his press had a very broad output, including liturgical books, devotional works, books in Greek and Latin, vernacular Italian works and even music editions. At least half of Giovanni Antonio's production was commissioned, his clients included Frederico Torresano and his brother Giovanni Francesco, sons of his mentor, Andrea Torresano, Melchiorre Sessa and Francesco Marcolini, for whom he printed six editions of works by Pietro Aretino.

The EDIT16 database lists 66 extant volumes by the brothers. Some notable works include:

- Dante's Convivio, second edition printed, and claimed to be the first to include a woodcut of Dante
- History of Tagiapiera (1523) a chronicle lauding the valour of a Venetian captain in the liberation of Corfu from the Turks in 1520, by Iakovos Trivolis.
- Homer's Iliad, in Modern Greek, translation by Nikolaos Lukanis, 1527
- Latini, Brunetto (1528). Livres dou Tresor (in Italian). Venezia: Giovanni Antonio Nicolini da Sabbio & fratelli.
- Amadís de Gaula (1533) A Spanish Chivalric tale produced in Castilian for the Spanish Market, edited by Francisco Delicado, who added linguistic material intended to help Italians read Spanish
- The Pentecostarion (1544) printed by the brothers Giovanni Antonio and Pietro. It consists of 252 leaves and contains texts for the Orthodox liturgy. The cover page says "Gio. Ant. & Petrus de Nicolini de Sabio" (Fig 2)
- Typikon kai ta Aporreta (1545), the first version of the typikon of the Eastern Orthodox Church.
- The press also produced practical and decorative works, for example the embroidery pattern book Essempio di recammi (1527) (Fig 4) It was one of the first and very original textile pattern books to be issued in Italy after the emergence of the genre in Germany in 1523.
