= Cathwulf =

Anglo-Saxon learned man active in Francia (700s CE)

Cathwulf's letter starts with the large initial D

Cathwulf (Latin: Cathuulfus) was an Anglo-Saxon learned man active in Francia. He is known only from a letter he wrote to Charlemagne around 775.

Cathwulf's name is Anglo-Saxon and his letter shows that he received his education in the British Isles. He was probably a churchman, possibly also a courtier. Scholars are divided over whether he should be seen as a monk or a priest. By the time he wrote his letter, he was well-acquainted with recent Frankish history. It is unlikely that Cathwulf sent his letter from England, as has been suggested. His wording indicates that he regarded himself as Charlemagne's subject and "servant" (servulus). Reference to "my Charles" (Carlus mi) and a closing advocation to "read and consider carefully" (lege et intellege diligenter) have been taken to indicate personal closeness to the king, even to suggest for Cathwulf a prior status as the king's tutor.

Cathwulf's letter is undated. It must have been written no earlier than June 774, since it refers to Charlemagne's capture of Pavia in that month. Since it refers to several events going back to Charlemagne's accession in 768 and to no events later than 774, it was probably written in the immediate aftermath of the successful conquest of the Lombard Kingdom that culminated in the fall of Pavia. This places it in late 774 or early 775, after Charlemagne's adoption of the title rex Langobardorum (king of the Lombards).

Cathwulf may have been connected to the circle of the Anglo-Saxons Lullus and Boniface. He was also familiar with Hiberno-Latin literature. He quotes from 7th-century Irish treatise On the Twelve Abuses of the World, which he attributes to Saint Patrick, suggesting that he was reading it in a copy of the Hibernian Collection of Canons, which also attributes it to Patrick. He was also familiar with the ideas of Ambrosiaster and the Etymologies of Isidore of Seville. He was also interested in numerology and he constructed the letter around two parallel groups of eight: the eight proofs of God's favour to Charlemagne and the eight columns that support a just king's rule. The eight columns are based on one of the so-called Greek Proverbs, a collection of Irish origin, although the proverb of the eight columns was not part of the original.

Cathwulf's letter is preserved only in a manuscript from the Abbey of Saint-Denis (now Paris, BNF, lat. 2777, formerly Regius 3989). It does not appear to have circulated widely or been widely read. There is no certain evidence that it was ever available in England. Wulfstan II of York shows knowledge of the proverb of the eight columns, but he probably got it from Sedulius Scottus, who wrote in Francia. Asser, who knew the eight columns, provides a definition of enchiridion that is similar to Cathwulf's, but this is not proof that he had read him. Alcuin of York is the only English writer who probably read Cathwulf, but only after his move to Francia. He wrote a letter to King Æthelred I of Northumbria in 793 that very closely parallels Cathwulf.

Richard Sullivan proposes that Cathwulf's letter may have influenced Charlemagne directly. Before informing the king that "there are eight columns characteristic of a just king", Cathwulf worries that "you [Charles] have few firm columns, I fear, on which to sustain the fortress of God." Sullivan suggests that this may have been a reference to the weakness of the upstart Carolingian dynasty, which may have prompted Charlemagne to give his twin sons born in 778 names appropriated from the old Merovingian dynasty, namely, Louis and Lothair.

== Editions ==
- Cathwulf, "Letter to Charlemagne", ed. Ernst Dümmler, MGH Epistolae 4 (1895):501–505.

== Bibliography ==
- Garrison, Mary (1997). "The English and the Irish at the Court of Charlemagne". In Paul Leo Butzer; Max Kerner; Walter Oberschelp (eds.). Karl der Grosse und sein Nachwirken: 1200 Jahre Kultur und Wissenschaft in Europa. Brepols. pp. 97–123. doi:10.1484/M.STHS-EB.4.2017007. ISBN 978-2-503-50673-9.
- Simpson, Dean (1987). "The 'Proverbia Grecorum'". Traditio. 43: 1–22. doi:10.1017/S0362152900012460. JSTOR 27831196. S2CID 151839109.
- Story, Joanna (1999). "Cathwulf, Kingship, and the Royal Abbey of Saint-Denis". Speculum. 74 (1): 1–21. doi:10.2307/2887268. JSTOR 2887268. S2CID 162218010.
- Sullivan, Richard E. (1995). "The Gentle Voices of Teachers": Aspects of Learning in the Carolingian Age. Ohio State University Press.
- Wright, Charles D. (2008–2013). "Cathwulf" (PDF). Sources of Anglo-Saxon Literary Culture. Bede.net.
