= Ruben of Dairinis =

Irish scholar (died 725)

Ruben of Dairinis (died 725) was an Irish scholar. He was, along with Cú Chuimne of Iona, responsible for the great compendium known as Collectio canonum Hibernensis (Irish collection of Canon law).

== Sources ==
- "Hiberno-Latin Literature to 1169", Dáibhí Ó Crónín, "A New History of Ireland", volume one, 2005.
- Die irische Kanonensammlung, ed. Hermann Wasserschleben, Leipzig, 1885.
- Some seventh-century Hiberno-Latin texts and their relationships, Aidan Breen, Peritia, iii, pp. 204–14, 1984.
