= Federico Torresano =

16th-century Venetian printer and publisher

Frederico Torresano, (also Torregiani; Torresani; Torresanus; Turresanus) was an editor, publisher, financier and member of a consortium of Venetian book printers in Venice.

He was son of printer Andrea Torresano and brother-in-law to Aldus Manutius, co-founder of the Aldine Press who had married Frerico's sister Maria. Frederico later married Paolo Manuzio, daughter of Aldus, further deepening the familial connections. As a publisher he used several different printing presses of including those of Giovanni Antonio Nicolini da Sabbio, and the heirs of Aldus Manutius the Elder, who were his nephews.

He died suddenly on January 24, 1561, in Asola, leaving his daughters Andreana and Chiara as heirs.

EDIT16 shows 64 surviving editions are credited to him between 1538 and 1561. He published under three different marks.

== Aldine Press ==
After the death of his father Andrea Torresano in 1528 he worked in partnership with his brother Francesco and nephew Paolo Manuzio as a printer-publisher at the Aldine Press, where he continued the work on the Aldine Bible. The editorial work had been divided up amongst the family, with the first part done by his father Andreas, the second part by Frederico, and the third part, the New Testament, by his brother Franciscus.

He is frequently named on the title page of the Aldine editions, as Venetiis apud Federicum Turrisanum ("at the house of Frederic Terrasano"), showing that for some editions he was the sole printer/publisher. Editions that he was involved in ranged from dictionaries, Greek philosophical works, Byzantine texts and medicine.

Frederico was mainly involved in running the family finances, both in their home town of Asola and Venice. This is evidenced by the edition of Aristotle's Meterologica, with Byzantine commentary of Olympiodorus and John Philoponus which has the note "Venetiis : apud Aldi filios : expensis vero nobilis viri domini Federici de Turrisanis eorum avunculi", stating that the edition was financed by their uncle.

He also often represented the family business before the Venetian Senate.

== Compagnia della Corona publications ==
In 1539 he joined the Compagnia della Corona which was a consortium of leading Venetian publishers. Other founding members included the families of Lucantonio Giunti, Ottavino Scoto and Gabriele Giolito de'Ferrari. The consortium used a crown as its identifier. The consortium focused on legal texts including commentaries of standard texts of Roman law and commentaries by jurists such as Bartolus of Saxoferrato and Filippo Decio.

== On his own ==
Although his name rarely appeared on publications while his father was alive, this changed on his father's death in 1528. In 1538 he started to published under his own printers name, and used the device of a crenelated tower (a possible pun on his name) and the device Federicus Turrisanus around it inside a ribbon. He also funded works with other printers. His output was both scholarly Greek works, and contemporary authors.

== Notable works ==
- The Italian translation of Tirant lo Blanc (Tirante il bianco, 1538), dedicated to Federico Gonzaga, Duke of Mantua which is accompanied by surviving archival correspondence between Federico and the Duke.
- Etymologicum Magnum (1549), edited with the assistance of the prominent Greek scholar Giovanni Battista Camozzi (also born in Asola), which bibliographers rank above even earlier rival editions.
- Aristotle's Meteorologica, with Byzantine commentary of Olympiodorus and John Philoponus
