= Cú Chuimne =

Irish monk

Cú Chuimne (died 747 AD) was a monk and scholar of Iona. Cú Chuimne, along with Ruben of Dairinis, was responsible for the great compendium known as Collectio canonum Hibernensis (Irish collection of Canon law), which is the first systematic western collection of canon law.

Cú Chuimne is credited with composing the hymn to the Virgin Mary Cantemus in omni die. This hymn is one of the earliest pieces of evidence for devotion to Mary in the Irish church and is described by James F. Kenney as ‘the finest example extant of Hiberno-Latin versification’. His obit in the Annals of Ulster refers to him as sapiens (learned), and quotes a short Old Irish poem that is humorously descriptive of his somewhat eclectic career:

Cú Chuimne in youth
read his way through half the truth.
He let the other half lie
while he gave women a try.
Well for him in old age.
He became a holy sage.
He gave women the last laugh.
He read the other half.

Of which Dáibhí Ó Cróinín recently remarked: "We are not told which he preferred."

== Sources ==
- Die irische Kanonensammlung, ed. Hermann Wasserschleben. Leipzig, 1885.
- Breen, Aidan. "Some seventh-century Hiberno-Latin texts and their relationships." Peritia 3 (1984)": pp. 204–14.
- Ó Crónín, Dáibhí. "Hiberno-Latin Literature to 1169." In A New History of Ireland, volume one, 2005.
