= De duodecim abusivis saeculi =

7th-century Latin language treatise from Ireland

De duodecim abusivis saeculi (“On the Twelve Abuses of the World”), also titled simply De duodecim abusivis, is a Hiberno-Latin treatise on social and political morality written by an anonymous Irish author between 630 and 700, or between 630 and 650. During the Middle Ages, the work was very popular throughout Europe.

== Origin ==
In the manuscripts, the work is frequently ascribed to a named author, most commonly Saint Cyprian or Saint Augustine; this led to early editions being published among the works of these authors.

In 1905, however, John Bagnell Bury pointed out that it quoted from the Latin Vulgate, which was incompatible with an attribution to Cyprian or Augustine. He pointed out that the ninth abuse was quoted almost entirely in the Collectio canonum Hibernensis, where it was ascribed to Saint Patrick; and that extracts from the same section were quoted in a letter addressed by Cathwulf, (Note: Probably an Anglo-Saxon at the court of Charlemagne.) circa A.D. 775, to King Charles the Great, and preserved in a ninth-century manuscript. He concluded that this evidence “proves that the treatise is older than A.D., 700, and strongly suggests that its origin is Irish, that it was ascribed in Ireland to Patrick, and travelled to Gaul under his name.”

In his 1909 edition, Siegmund Hellmann (de) adduced further evidence, establishing it as the work of an anonymous Irish author of the 7th century. Since then, its author is conventionally known as Pseudo-Cyprian.

== Sources ==
The text is based largely on the Bible, containing “over thirty citations from the Old Testament and twenty-three from the New excluding the Gospels, with nineteen more from the Gospels”; these citations are made from the Latin Vulgate.

Ever since Hellmann's edition, the Rule of St. Benedict has also been regarded as an important source. Hellmann regarded the ordering of the text into twelve abuses as a reversal of the twelve steps of the ladder of humility from the seventh chapter of the Rule. Breen thought it was more probable that it drew instead from the Regula Magistri, a different text which was itself a source for that chapter in the rule of St. Benedict. Constant Mews argues instead that it draws on the model of the twelve modes of forgiveness in the Irish penitential of Cummian. Meanwhile, Joyce argues it adapts the model of linguistic abuses from the twelve vices of grammar defined by Donatus.

The text also seems to have drawn on various of the Church Fathers, although none are cited by name; particularly, Origen, Cyprian, Ambrose, Augustine, Rufinus, Jerome, Cassian and Gregory the Great.

Hellmann thought that the text drew on St Isidore. Almost everyone agreed with this, but Breen did not.

== Twelve abuses ==
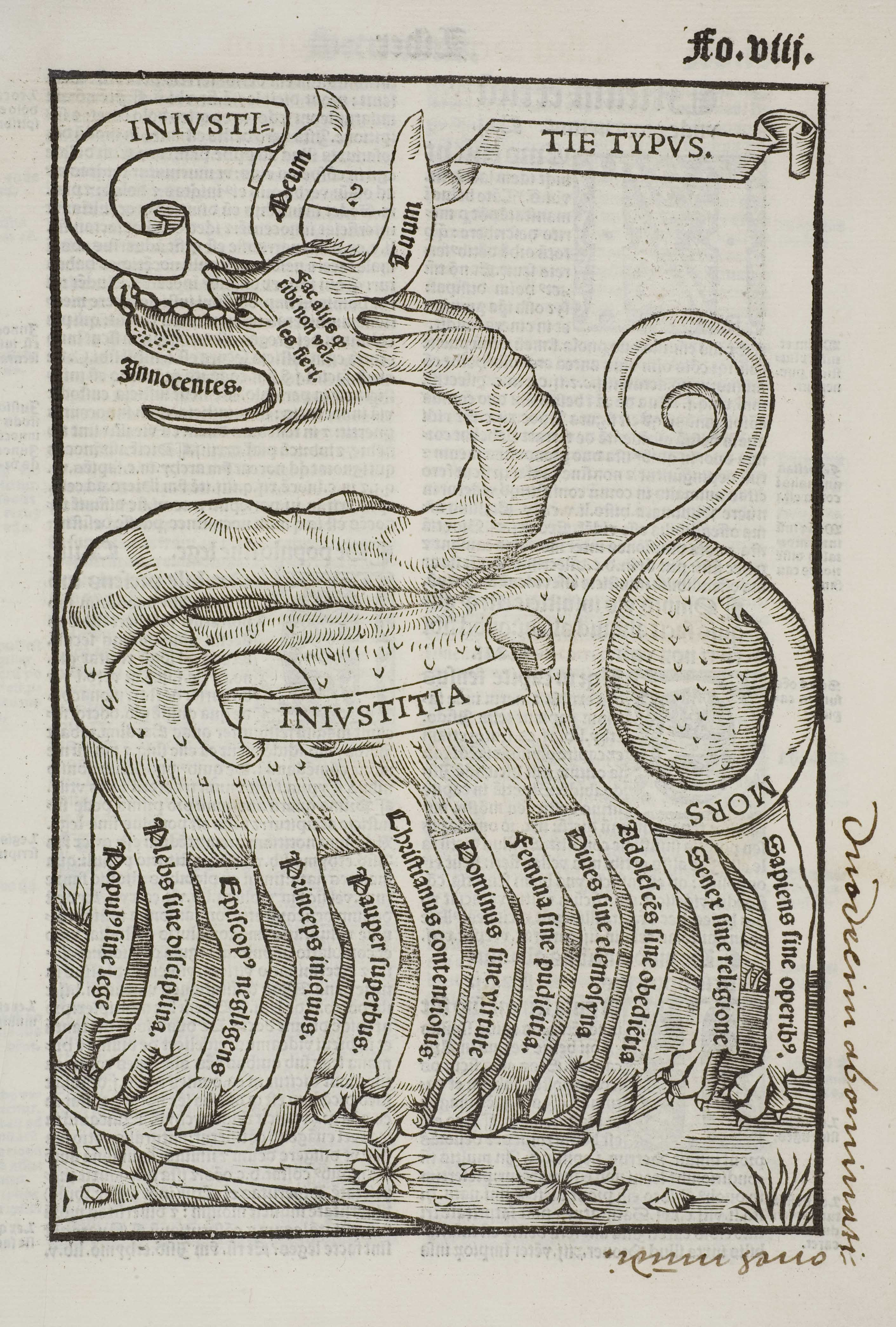
A variation of the twelve abuses is inscribed on the twelve legs of the metaphorical Beast of Injustice in Guillaume Rouillé's Justicie atque Iniusticie.

De duodecim abusivis condemns the following twelve abuses:

Abusivis	Abuse
sapiens sine operibus bonis	the wise man without good works
senex sine religione	the old man without religion
adolescens sine oboedientia	the young man without obedience
dives sine elemosyna	the rich man without almsgiving
femina sine pudicitia	the woman without modesty
dominus sine virtute	the lord without virtue
Christianius contentiosus	the argumentative Christian
pauper superbus	the poor man who is proud
rex iniquus	the unjust king
episcopus neglegens	the negligent bishop
plebs sine disciplina	the people without discipline
populus sine lege	the people without law

== Influence ==
The work was very influential, both directly and through the Hibernensis; especially the ninth abuse, the unjust king.

There is some direct evidence for the text's popularity in tenth-century England. Bishop Æthelwold of Winchester is known to have donated a copy to the Peterborough house. Ælfric of Eynsham drew on a version included in Abbo of Fleury's Collectio canonum for his Old English treatise De octo vitiis et de duodecim abusivis gradus, in which the section on the rex iniquus was translated whole.

Hellmann points out the extensive influence of the work upon Carolingian writings, such as the mirrors for princes, and later political literature.

Later, the work was quoted by multiple medieval theologians and scholars such as Vincent of Beauvais and John of Wales. Translations and adaptations in multiple vernacular languages were prepared.

== See also ==
- Collectio canonum Hibernensis
- Wisdom literature
