= Admonitions =

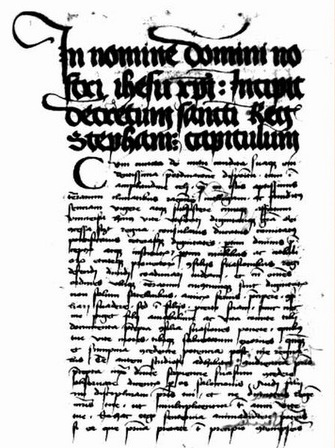
First page of the work

The Admonitions (Hungarian: Intelmek; Latin: Libellus de institutione morum) is a mirror for princes—a literary work summarizing the principles of government—completed in the 1010s or 1020s for King Stephen I of Hungary's son and heir, Emeric. About a century later, Bishop Hartvik claimed that Stephen I himself wrote the small book. Modern scholarship has concluded that a foreign cleric who was proficient in rhymed Latin prose compiled the text. The cleric has been associated with a Saxon monk, Thangmar; with the Venetian Bishop Gerard of Csanád; and with Archbishop Astrik of Esztergom.

== Sources ==
- Curta, Florin (2010). "King Stephen and the Conversion of Hungary (1000)". In Curta, Florin; Holt, Andrew (eds.). Great Events in Religion: An Encyclopedia of Pivotal Events in Religious History, Volume 2. ABC-Clio. pp. 483–485. ISBN 978-1-4408-4599-4.
- Nemerkényi, Előd (2004). "The Religious Ruler in the Admonitions of King Saint Stephen of Hungary". In Al-Azmeh, Aziz; Bak, János M. (eds.). Monotheistic Kingship: The Medieval Variants. Central European University. pp. 231–247. ISBN 963-7326-05-7.
- Niessen, James P. (2015). "Catholic monasticism, orders, and societies in Hungary: Centuries of expansion, disaster and revival". In Angeli Murzaku, Ines (ed.). Monasticism in Eastern Europe and the Former Soviet Republics. Central European University. pp. 231–247. ISBN 978-0-415-81959-6.
