= Carolinus =

Carolinus (or Karolinus) is an instructional poem written in Latin by twelfth-century poet Gilles de Paris for the future King Louis VIII of France. It is an example of the Mirror for Princes genre, which gained renewed popularity in many parts of Europe in the twelfth century. It was written between 1196 and 1200, and exists in two manuscripts from the early thirteenth century. It contains over two thousand verses in five sections. It is written as a biography of Charlemagne, showing how his life exemplified the four cardinal virtues, and urging Louis, who was thirteen years old in 1200, to follow this example and become a new Charlemagne.

The book is divided between five parts as such:

- Prologue
- Book I
- Book II
- Book III
- Book IV
- Book V
