= Iakovos Trivolis =

Greek Renaissance humanist and writer

Iakovos Trivolis (died 1547) was a Greek Renaissance humanist who worked in Corfu. He published a historical work titled History of Tallapieras after the exploits of the namesake Venetian ship captain. The book was printed in Venice by Giovanni Antonio Nicolini da Sabbio in 1523.

He also published the Story of the King of Scotia and the Queen of England, inspired by part of the Decameron.

Both were written in modern Greek, and are sometimes credited as among the first to be published in that language since most Greek scholars wrote in the Koine.

== See also ==
- Greek scholars in the Renaissance
