= Book of Treasures =

13th-century French manuscript by Brunetto Latini

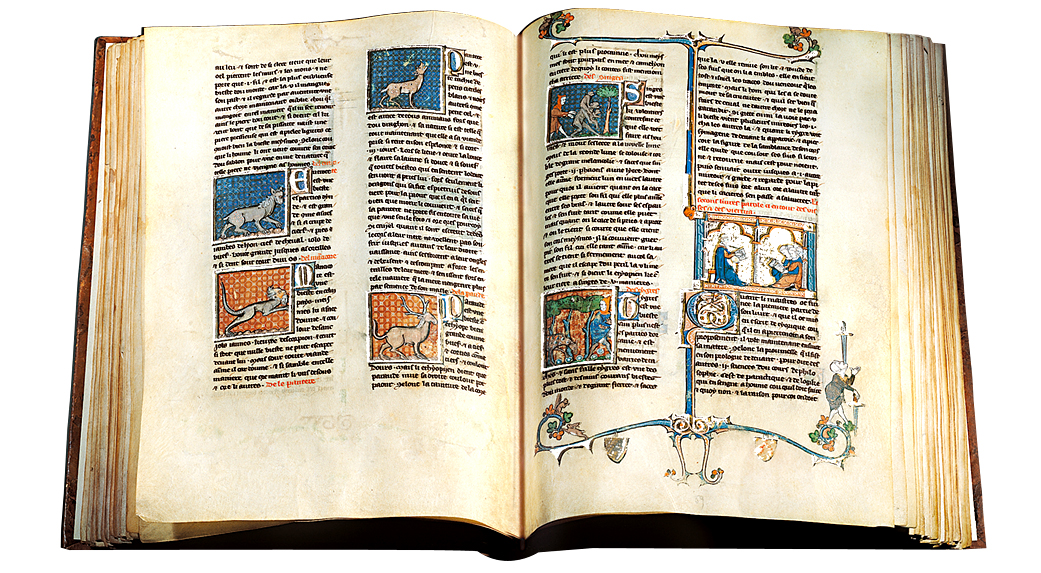
- A copy of the Book of Treasures
- Original title: Li livres dou Tresor
- Also known as: Trésor, Tesoro
- Author(s): Brunetto Latini
- Language: Old French
- Date: 1260 to 1267
- Subject: Encyclopedic compendium

The Book of Treasures (Old French: Li livres dou Tresor), also referred to by its modern Italian and French titles Tesoro and Trésor, is an encyclopedia written in Old French by Florentine politician, poet, historian and philosopher Brunetto Latini.

A compendium of the knowledge of the time, it is regarded as the first encyclopedia written in a modern European language.

== History ==
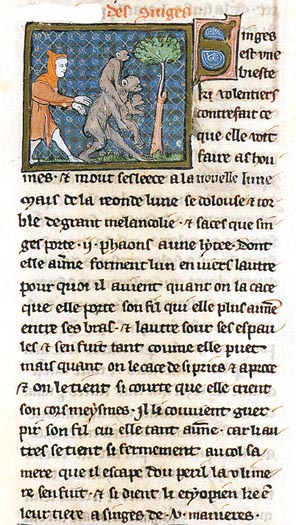
Detail of one of its pages.

Brunetto Latini wrote Li Livres dou Tresor in Old French between 1260 and 1267 while living in exile in France following the Guelph defeat at Montaperti. In the prologue, Latini gives two reasons for using French "Romance" rather than Italian: that he is writing in France, and that French is "more pleasant" and has "more in common" with other languages.

The Tresor circulated widely, and was quickly translated into Old Italian by Bono Giamboni. These translations are generally referred to as Tesoro, and authorship was later misattributed to Giamboni. The Italian translation entered print early, with an edition published at Treviso in 1474, and reprints at Venice in 1528 and 1533.

Manuscripts survive in several major collections, including the British Library, the Bibliothèque nationale de France, the National Library of Russia, and the Laurentian Library.

Napoleon I planned a printed French edition with commentaries and appointed a commission to prepare it. It was eventually published in 1863 in the Collection des documents inedits, edited by Polycarpe Chabaille from 42 MSS.

== Description ==
The Tresor consists of three books:

- the "universal history" knowledge of the time – beginning with Biblical history, followed by the history of Troy, Rome and the Middle Ages, it contains a natural history section and a comprehensive compilation of astronomy and geography, and addresses certain animal and bird species in-depth;
- ethics: the thinking of modern and classical moralists and considers the vices and virtues that characterize humanity;
- matters related to "politics and the art of governing", which according to the author "is the most honorable and the highest science, the noblest of professions on earth".

Some manuscripts present the work differently. The British Library's Yates Thompson MS 19 arranges it in four books, separating the material on vices and virtues from the section on ethics. The manuscript is also heavily illustrated, with 75 miniatures.
