= Speculum Principis (Skelton book) =

1501 work by John Skelton

Speculum Principis (A mirror of Princes) was a guide to "proper princely behaviour" written by John Skelton in August 1501. Skelton was a well-known poet and had been appointed as tutor to Henry VII's second son, Prince Henry, who would later reign as Henry VIII of England. A copy is now in the British Museum, which may or may not be exactly the same as the one given to Henry.

== See also ==
- Mirrors for princes
