= Waiting for the Dawn (book) =

Book by Huang Zongxi

Waiting for the Dawn: A Plan for the Prince
- Author: Huang Zongxi
- Original title: 明夷待訪錄
- Publication place: Qing Dynasty
- English publication date: 1993

Waiting for the Dawn
- Simplified Chinese: 明夷待访录
- Traditional Chinese: 明夷待訪錄
Transcriptions
Standard Mandarin
- Hanyu Pinyin: Míngyí dài fǎng lù

Waiting for the Dawn: A Plan for the Prince (translation by William Theodore de Bary for "Ming Yi Dai Fang Lu"; simplified Chinese: 明夷待访录; traditional Chinese: 明夷待訪錄) is a political work written by Huang Zongxi (1610–1695), known as "The Father of Chinese Enlightenment". This radical text openly criticises the absolute monarchy prevailing in China, and is interpreted by contemporary authors as a precursor of theories of civil rights and calls for a democratic political system. Huang first began writing the book in the eighteenth year of the reign of Shunzhi in the Qing Dynasty (1661), and completed it in the first year of Kangxi (1662), about a century before The Social Contract by Jean-Jacques Rousseau. It would become highly influential during the late Qing’s Wuxu Reform and other attempts at establishing a constitutional monarchy in China.

The English edition of Ming Yi Dai Fang Lu, translated by Wm. Theodore de Bary as Waiting for the Dawn, was published by Columbia University Press in 1993.

== Receptions ==
Liang Qichao compared the book to Rousseau's On the Social Contract, arguing that it was written "decades before On the Social Contract was published, and that it could be considered a noble product of human culture".

A Chinese political science researcher argues that we do not necessarily have to agree with the view that the Waiting for the Dawn "containing spirit of democracy", but we must acknowledge the fact that the book has become an internal trend in foreign democratic thought.

Cai Yuanpei described the Waiting for the Dawn as "the harbinger of free thought". Hou Wailu considered the book to be 'similar' to the ancient Chinese Declaration of Human Rights.

It is also argued that Huang Zongxi's Waiting for the Dawn is not at all comparable to Rousseau's On the Social Contract or Montesquieu's The Spirit of the Laws.
