= Alessandro Benedetti =

Italian surgeon and anatomist

- Born: c. 1450; Parma
- Died: 1512 (aged 61–62)
- Occupation: Surgeon general of the Venetian army
- Notable work: Anatomice, or The History of the Human Body

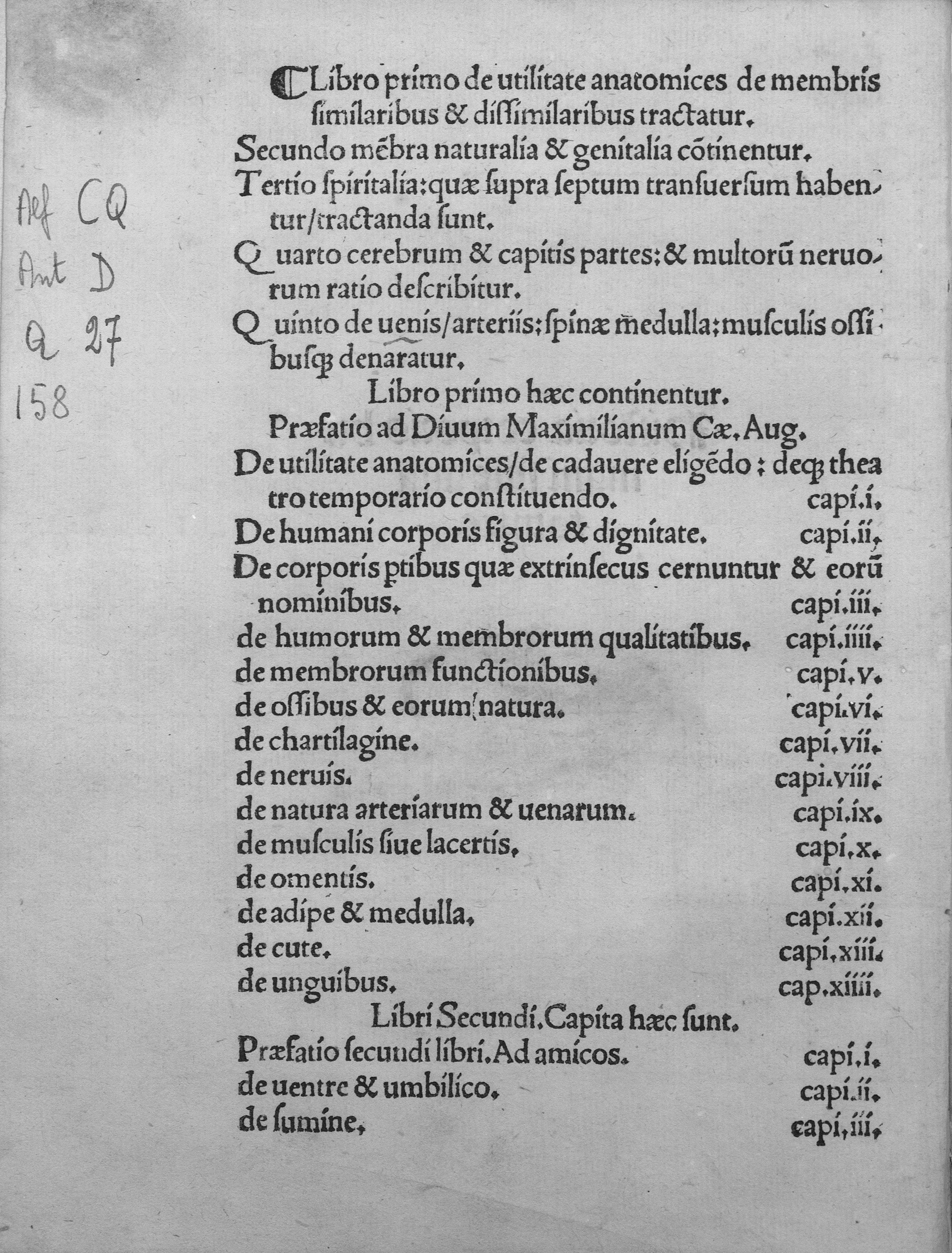
Historia corporis humani by Benedetti

Alessandro Benedetti (c. 1450–1512) was born in Parma, traveled and worked extensively in Greece and Crete, and worked as surgeon general of the Venetian army.

His Anatomice, or The History of the Human Body is a descriptive anatomy in the style of Mundinus. It concludes with a final chapter on the praise of dissection. He expresses the need for a clinical examination rather than uncritical trust in the authorities "since in it we see the truth and contemplate its revelations as the works of nature lie under our eyes… but those who trust only the monuments of literature… are often deceived and entrust opinion rather than truth to their minds." He later describes a postmortem examination of a woman who had died of syphilis and the disease's effects on her bones. Benedetti critiqued those anatomists who trusted in the authorities more than their own experience: "Aristotle has had so much authority for so many centuries that even those things which [physicians] have not seen they will affirm to exist, even without experiment." Benedetti valued personal observation over blind trust in the authorities and even, shockingly for the time, corrected Aristotle. "Aristotle believes that the nerves first arise from the heart… but almost all of them (as is more evidently established) are perceived to originate in large part from the brain…." Medieval scholars preferred to trust the authorities over their own observations, while this new generation of anatomists increasingly valued experience over theory.

Living through the Italian Wars, he wrote a commentary on the Battle of Farnovo of 1495 as he was tending to the wounds of the injured, experiencing first hand the horrors of the battle, he mentioned "on every side the sky flashed repeatedly with fire and thundered with artillery ... and iron, bronze and lead hissed pass and the air was filled with wails and cries".
