= Nikolaos Loukanis =

Nikolaos Loukanis was a 16th-century Greek Renaissance humanist. He worked in Venice where in 1526 he produced a translation of Homer's Iliad into modern Greek which is credited as one of the first literary texts published in Modern Greek (as most contemporary Greek scholars wrote in the Koine).

== Known works ==
- Homer's Iliad, translation into modern Greek

== See also ==
- Greek scholars in the Renaissance
