= Wm. Theodore de Bary =

American sinologist and scholar of East Asian philosophy (1919–2017)

- Born: William Theodore de Bary; August 9, 1919; The Bronx, New York, U.S.
- Died: July 14, 2017 (aged 97); Tappan, New York, U.S.

Academic background
- Education: Columbia University (BA, MA, PhD)

Academic work
- Institutions: Columbia University
- Main interests: Chinese literature, Neo-Confucianism

William Theodore de Bary (Chinese: 狄培理; pinyin: Dí Péilǐ; August 9, 1919 – July 14, 2017) was an American Sinologist and scholar of East Asian philosophy who was a professor and administrator at Columbia University for nearly 70 years.

De Bary graduated from Columbia College in 1941, where he was a student in the first year of Columbia's famed Literature Humanities course. He then briefly took up graduate studies at Harvard University before leaving to serve in American military intelligence in the Pacific Theater of World War II. Upon his return, he resumed his studies at Columbia, where he completed his Ph.D. in 1953.

== Life and career ==
William Theodore "Ted" de Bary was born on August 9, 1919, in The Bronx, New York, and grew up in Leonia, New Jersey. De Bary's great-uncle was the German surgeon and botanist Anton de Bary, and his father William de Bary (1882–1963) immigrated to the U.S. from Germany in 1914. His parents divorced when he was a small child, and his mother raised him as a single mother. He formally changed his first name to "Wm." to distinguish himself from his father. He entered Columbia University in 1937, and began studying Chinese the following year as a sophomore. After graduating with his Bachelor of Arts in 1941, de Bary began graduate study in Chinese at Harvard University, but the following year he was recruited by the U.S. Navy to undergo intensive training in Japanese and serve as an intelligence officer in the Pacific Theatre of World War II.

In 1947, de Bary left the military and returned to Columbia for graduate study in Chinese. He received an MA in 1948 followed by a PhD in 1953 with a dissertation entitled "A Plan for the Prince: the Ming-i tai-fang lu of Huang Tsung-hsi", and became a professor afterward.

From 1960 to 1966 he served as the chair of the Department of East Asian Languages and Cultures. He served as president of the Association for Asian Studies from 1969 to 1970.

De Bary was active in faculty intervention during the Columbia University protests of 1968. He served as Columbia University's provost from 1971 to 1978.

De Bary was famous for rarely missing a Columbia Lions football game since he began teaching at the university in 1953.

=== Work on the Core Curriculum ===
He reshaped the Core Curriculum of Columbia College to include Great Books and classes devoted to non-Western civilizations.

In order to create textbooks for the non-Western version of the Columbia humanities course, he drew together teams of scholars to translate original source material, Sources of Chinese Tradition (1960), Sources of Japanese Tradition, and Sources of Indian Tradition. His extensive publications made the case for the universality of Asian values and a tradition of democratic values in Confucianism. He is recognized as training the graduate students and mentoring the scholars who created the field of Neo-Confucian studies.

De Bary founded the Heyman Center for the Humanities in 1976 and served as its director.

A recognized educator, he won Columbia's Great Teacher Award in 1970, its Lionel Trilling Book Award for Neo-Confucian Orthodoxy and Heart and the Learning of the Mind-and-Heart in 1983 and its Mark Van Doren Award for Great Teaching in 1988.

== Personal life ==
De Bary lived in Tappan, New York at his home which was named Hotokudo. He was married to Mary Fanny Brett de Bary and had four children.

He continued teaching until the end of the spring semester in 2017, only a few months before his death at the age 97.

== Prizes and honors ==
- Watumull Prize of the American Historical Association, 1958
- Fishburn Prize of Educational Press Association, 1964
- Elected to the American Academy of Arts and Sciences, 1974
- Edwin O. Reischauer Lectures, 1986
- Elected to the American Philosophical Association, 1999
- Elevated to the Order of the Rising Sun, Third Class
- Philolexian Award for Distinguished Literary Achievement, 2010
- National Humanities Medal, 2013
- Tang Prize in Sinology, 2016

== Honorary degrees ==
- St. Lawrence University, DLitt, 1968
- Loyola University of Chicago, LHD, 1970
- Columbia University. DLitt, 1994

== Major works ==
=== Original works ===
- The Great Civilized Conversation: Education for a World Community (CUP, 2013)
- Self and Society in Ming Thought (ACLS Humanities E-Book, 2011)
- Living Legacies at Columbia (CUP, 2006)
- Nobility and Civility: Asian Ideals of Leadership and the Common Good, (Harvard UP, 2004)
- Asian Values and Human Rights: A Confucian Communitarian Perspective. Harvard UP (2000)
- Learning for One's Self: Essays on the Individual in Neo-Confucian Thought (CUP, 1991)
- The Trouble with Confucianism, (Harvard UP, 1991)
- Eastern canons: Approaches to the Asian Classics (CUP, 1990)
- Message of the mind in Neo-Confucianism (CUP, 1989)
- Neo-Confucian Education: the Formative Stage (University of California Press, 1989)
- East Asian Civilizations: a Dialogue in Five Stages, (Harvard UP, 1988)
- The Rise of Neo-Confucianism in Korea (1985)
- The Liberal Tradition in China (Chinese University of Hong Kong Press, 1983)
- Yüan thought: Chinese Thought and Religion under the Mongols (CUP, 1982)
- Neo-Confucian Orthodoxy and the Learning of the Mind-And-Heart (CUP, 1981)
- Principle and Practicality: Essays in Neo-Confucianism and Practical Learning (CUP, 1979)
- Unfolding of Neo-Confucianism (CUP, 1975)
- Self and Society in Ming Thought (CUP, 1970)
- The Buddhist Tradition in India, China and Japan (Random House, 1969)
- Approaches to Asian Civilizations (CUP, 1964)
- Guide to Oriental Classics (CUP, 1964) end ed. 1975. 3rd ed. 1988

=== Original translations ===
- Waiting for the Dawn: a Plan for the Prince (1993)
- Five Women who Loved Love (Tuttle, 1956)

=== Edited volumes ===
- Finding Wisdom in East Asian Classics (CUP, 2011)
- Sources of East Asian Tradition. 2 vols [vol. 1 published subtitled Premodern Asia]; [vol 2 subtitled The modern Period] (CUP, 2008)
- Sources of Korean Tradition: Volume 1 (Harvard UP, 1997) 2nd ed. 2001
- Confucianism and Human Rights (CUP, 1998) with Tu Weiming
- Sources of Japanese Tradition (1958), with Ryūsaku Tsunoda and Donald Keene 2nd ed published as earliest times to 1600 (2001) with Donald Keene, George Tanabe, Paul Varley vol 2 published as 1600 to 2000 with Carol Gluck and Arthur Tiedemann (2005)
- Sources of Chinese Tradition: Volume 1 (CUP, 1960) expanded 2 vols ed. Columbia UP, 1999 and 2000
- Approaches to the Oriental Classics: Asian Literature and Thought in General Education (1958/9)
- Sources of Indian Tradition, 2 vols (1957 and 1964), with Stephen N. Hay and I. H. Qureshi 2nd ed. 1988
