= Saint Emeric of Hungary =

Hungarian prince (c. 1007 – 1031)

Saint Emeric
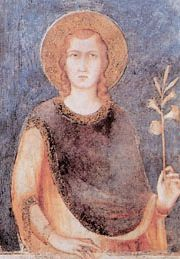
- Saint Emeric of Hungary

Prince and heir to the Hungarian throne
- Born: 1007; Székesfehérvár
- Died: September 2, 1031; Hegyközszentimre (assumed place)
- Venerated in: Catholic Church; Eastern Orthodox Church
- Canonized: 1083, Székesfehérvár by Pope Gregory VII
- Major shrine: St. Emeric's Church, Székesfehérvár
- Feast: November 5, in Hungary: September 4 (burial of his relics)
- Attributes: Boar, Lily Stem, Sword
- Patronage: Youth, Hungarian Americans

Emeric (Hungarian: Szent Imre herceg; also Emericus, Emerick, Emery or Emory), venerated as Saint Emeric (c. 1007 – 2 September 1031), was the son of King Stephen I of Hungary and Giselle of Bavaria.

== Life ==
=== Family ===
Emeric is believed to have been the second son of Stephen I. Named after his maternal uncle, Emperor Henry II, he was the only one of Stephen’s sons to survive into adulthood. His Hungarian name, Imre, derives from the Latin name Henricus, which means "ruler of the home".

=== Education ===
Emeric was educated in a strict and ascetic spirit by the Benedictine monks from Venice, Gerard, from the age of 15 to 23. He was intended to be the next monarch of Hungary, and his father wrote his Admonitions to prepare him for this task. His father tried to make Emeric co-heir still in his lifetime.

He married in the year 1022. The identity of his wife is disputed. Some say it was Irene Monomachina, a relative of Byzantine emperor Constantine IX Monomachos, or a female member of the Argyros family to which Byzantine emperor Romanos III Argyros belonged. Other say it was Patricissa of Croatia, the daughter of Krešimir III of Croatia. Another possible person may have been Adelaide/Rixa of Poland or one of her unnamed sisters.

== Death and sainthood ==
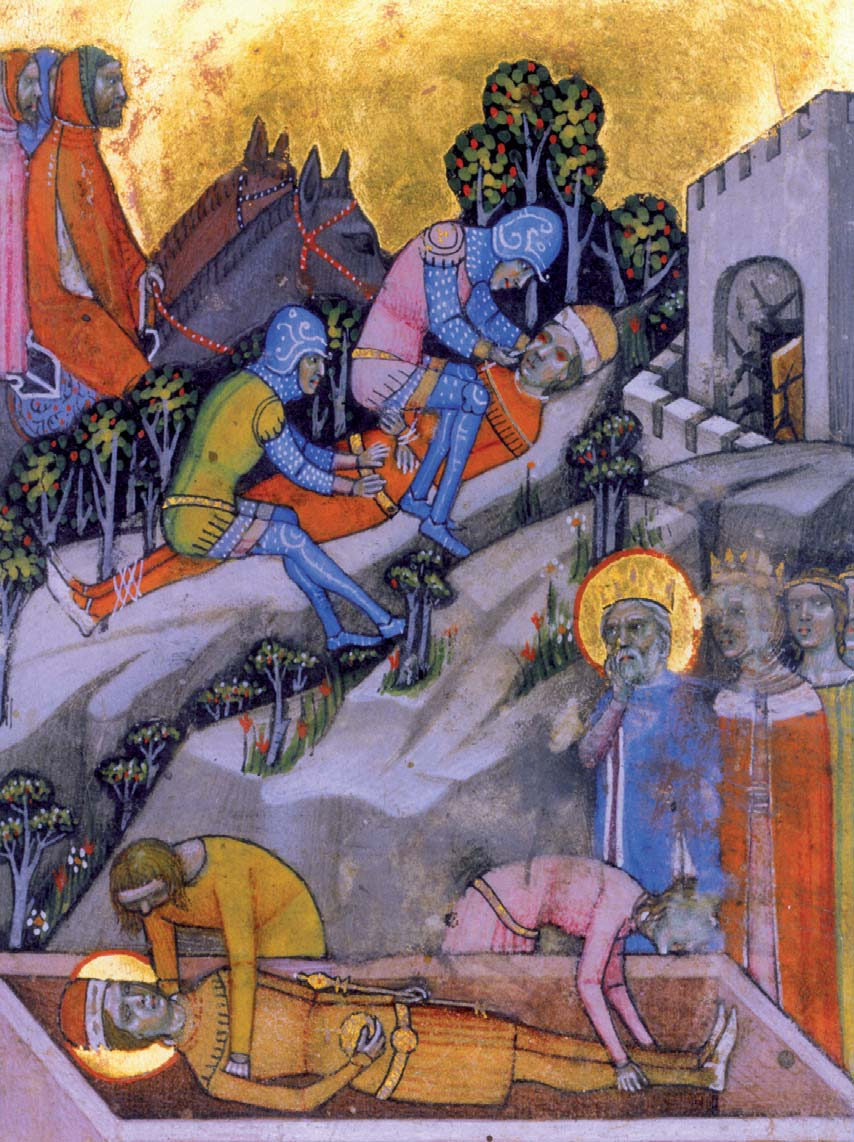
Prince Emeric's funeral and the blinding of Vazul (Chronicon Pictum, 1358)

The succession plans of Emeric's father could never be fulfilled: on 2 September 1031, at age 24, Emeric was killed by a boar while hunting. It is assumed that this happened in Hegyközszentimre (presently Sântimreu, Romania). He was buried in the Székesfehérvár Basilica. Several wondrous healings and conversions happened at his grave, so on 5 November 1083 King Ladislaus I unearthed Emeric's bones in a large ceremony, and Emeric was canonised for his pious life and purity along with his father and Bishop Gerard of Csanád by Pope Gregory VII.

Emeric is most commonly depicted wearing knight’s armor, a crown, and holding a lily. Some people claim that the Italian explorer Amerigo Vespucci—after whom the Americas are named—was named in his honor, though there is no definitive evidence to support this etymology.

== See also ==
- Isten, hazánkért térdelünk
