= Philip of Leyden =

Dutch jurist

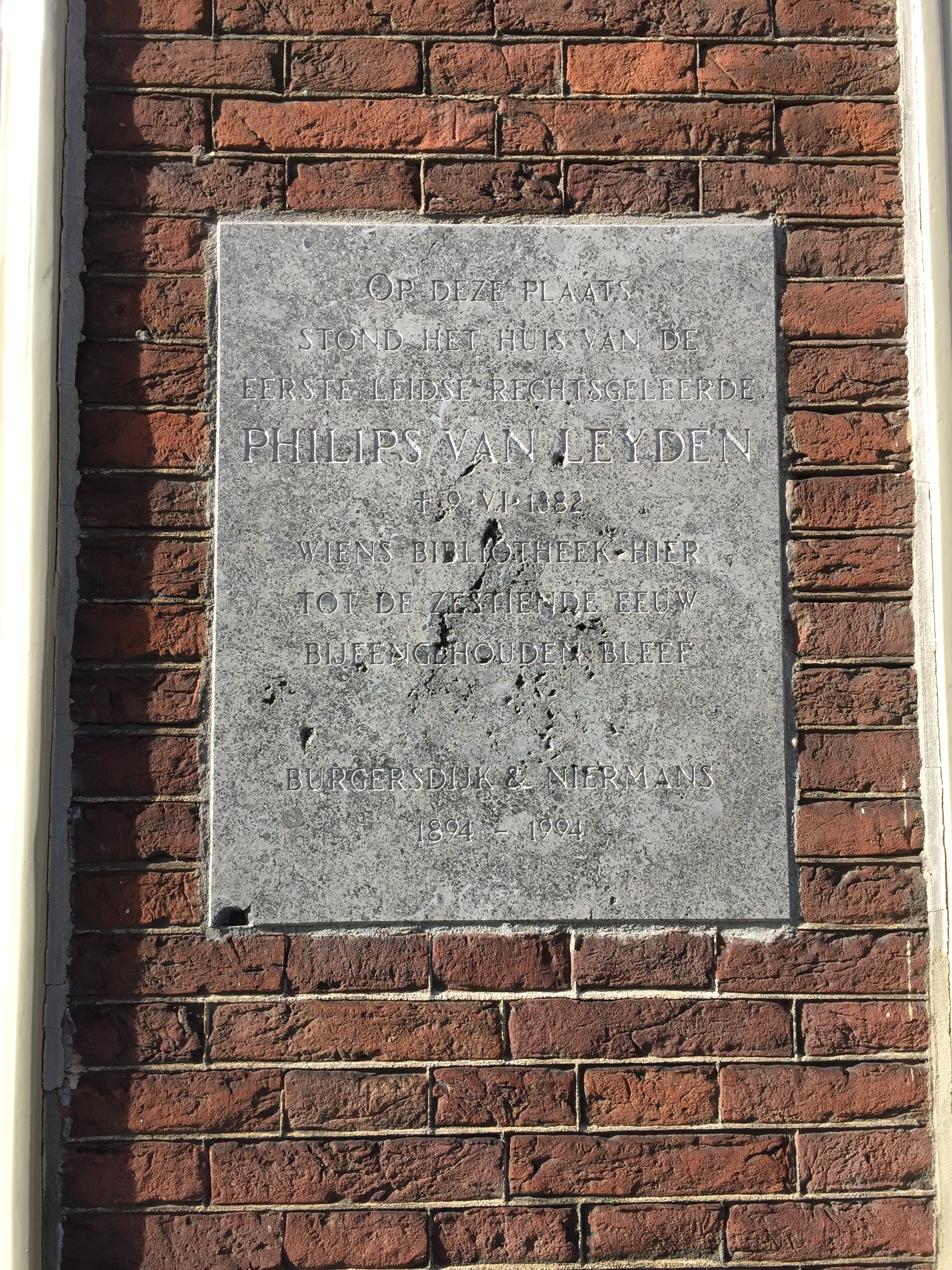
Plaque in Leiden

Philip of Leyden (c. 1326 – 9 June 1382) was a Dutch jurist who wrote a political treatise, De cura reipublicae et sorte principantis ("On the care of the state and the role of the ruler"). Its key sentence is, "Princes have certain rights which they cannot renounce and this in order to save the state, for the prosperity of the state depends on the power of the prince".

Philip was the youngest of 15 children. In 1345 he studied law at the University of Orléans. His personal library had 73 books. In 1353 he joined the court of Count William V of Holland. In 1355 he became canon in Amsterdam, then in 1357 in Condé and finally in 1359 in Middelburg. In 1369 he received from the University of Paris a doctorate in canon law, becoming a doctor decretorum. Philip founded a chapter of the Hooglandse (St Pancras) Kerk in Leiden.

Philip was buried in the Pieterskerk in Leiden. There are memorial plaques there and in the Hooglandse Kerk. His treatise, which he wrote around 1355, was first printed in 1516. A facsimile edition was published by Robert Feenstra at Amsterdam in 1971.
