= Brunetto Latini =

Italian scholar and statesman, c. 1220–1294

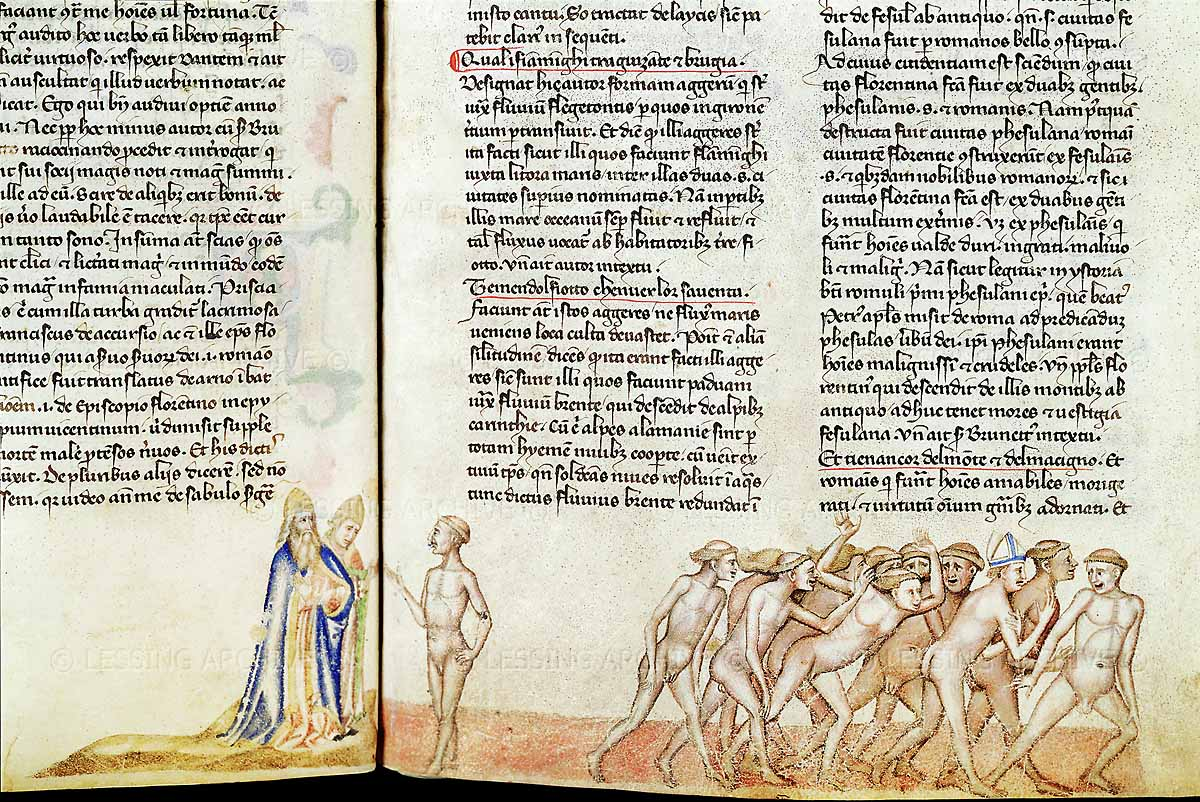
Dante and Virgil interview Brunetto among the sodomites, from Guido da Pisa's commentary on the Commedia (c. 1345)

Brunetto Latini (who signed his name Burnectus Latinus in Latin and Burnecto Latino in Italian; c. 1220–1294) was an Italian philosopher, scholar, notary, politician and statesman. He was a teacher and friend of Dante Alighieri.

== Life ==
Brunetto Latini was born in Florence in 1220 to a Tuscan noble family, the son of Buonaccorso Latini. He belonged to the Guelph party. He was a notary and a man of learning, much respected by his fellow citizens and famed for his skill as an orator. He expounded the writings of Cicero as guidance in public affairs.

He was of sufficient stature to be sent to Seville on an embassy to Alfonso X of Castile to seek help for Florence against the Sienese; the mission was unsuccessful. On his return from Spain, travelling along the Pass of Roncesvalles, he describes meeting a student from Bologna astride a bay mule, who told him of the defeat of the Guelphs at the Battle of Montaperti. As a result, Latini was exiled from his native city. He took refuge in France from 1261 to 1268 while working as a notary in Montpellier, Arras, Bar-sur-Aube, and Paris.

In 1269, when the political situation allowed, he returned to Tuscany and for some twenty years held successive high offices. In 1273, he was appointed as Secretary to the Council of the Republic of Florence. In 1280, he contributed to the temporary reconciliation between the Guelph and Ghibelline parties, and in 1284 presided over the conference in which an attack on Pisa was agreed. Finally, in 1287, he was elevated to the dignity of "prior" as one of 12 magistrates established through the constitution of 1282.

Giovanni Villani says that "he was a great philosopher and a consummate master of rhetoric, not only in knowing how to speak well, but how to write well". He was the author of various works in prose and verse. He died in 1294, leaving behind a daughter, Bianca Latini, who had married Guido Di Filippo De' Castiglionchi in 1284. His tomb can be found in the church of Santa Maria Maggiore, Florence, to the left of the high altar.

== Works ==
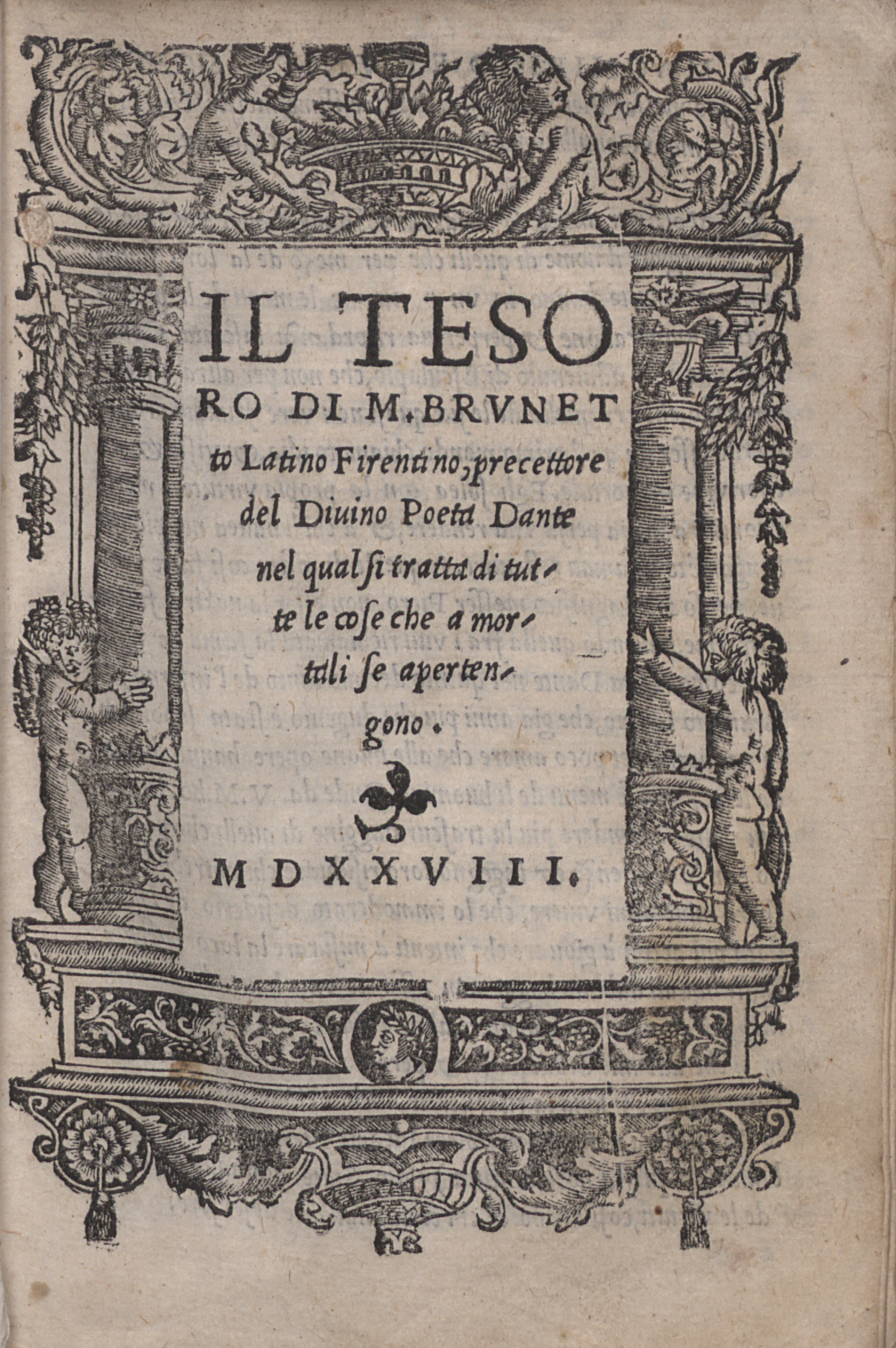
Livres dou Tresor

While in France, he wrote his Italian Tesoretto and in French his prose Li Livres dou Trésor, both summaries of the encyclopaedic knowledge of the day. The latter is regarded as the first encyclopedia in a modern European language. The Italian 13th-century translation known as Tesoro was misattributed to Bono Giamboni. He also translated into Italian the Rettorica and three Orations by Cicero. The Italian translation of Aristotle's Nicomachean Ethics is often misattributed to Brunetto Latini: it is a work of Taddeo Alderotti instead.

=== Publications ===
- Livres dou Tresor (in Italian). Venezia: Giovanni Antonio Nicolini da Sabbio & fratelli. 1528.
- Julia Bolton Holloway, ed. (2021). Il Tesoro di Brunetto Latino, Maestro di Dante Alighieri (in Italian). Regione Toscana|Firenze. Archived from the original on 2021-03-01.

== The Divine Comedy ==
Some writers have stated that Brunetto Latini was Dante Alighieri’s guardian after the death of his father. Dante’s father, Alighiero di Bellincione degli Alighieri, died sometime between 1281 and 1283, and there is no document showing that Brunetto Latini became Dante’s guardian. The claim that he was Dante’s guardian may be due to Dante calling him caro e buono padre (dear and good father) in Canto XV of his Inferno. The claim is not supported by reliable historical sources. It appears only in much later, non‑scholarly summaries and is rejected by major Dante scholars. Early Dante commentators spoke of Brunetto as his teacher, as does Dante himself. Vittorio Imbriani took issue with that concept, saying Brunetto was far too busy a man to have been a mere teacher. Dante immortalized him in the Divine Comedy (see Inferno, XV. 22–87). It is also believed that there was an intellectual and affectionate bond between the elderly man and the young poet. It was perhaps Latini who induced Dante to read Cicero and Boethius, after the death of Beatrice.

Many of the characters in Dante's Inferno are also mentioned in the legal and diplomatic documents Brunetto Latini wrote in Latin. There is a portrait of Latini in the Palazzo del Bargello in Florence, attributed to Giotto, depicting Latini standing alongside Dante and Corso Donati. In a wood engraving, Gustave Doré envisages the same scene from Inferno XV, 1861.

=== Canto XV ===
Dante places Latini within the third ring of the Seventh Circle, the Circle of the Violent against God, nature and art, with the blasphemers, sodomites, and usurers. Dante writes of the "clerks and great and famous scholars, defiled in the world by one and the same sin".

Dante's treatment of Latini, however, is commendatory beyond almost any other figure in the 'Inferno'. He calls the poet a radiance among men and speaks with gratitude of that sweet image, gentle and paternal, / you were to me in the world when hour by hour / you taught me how man makes himself eternal. Dante addresses Latini with the respectful pronoun voi; Latini uses the informal tu, as perhaps was their custom when they spoke together in Florence. The portrait is drawn with love, pathos and a dignity that is more compelling given the squalor of the punishment.

Latini asks first, humbly, if he may keep Dante company, letting his group run on. Dante offers to sit down with him, but that would only increase Latini's penalty; he and the other souls are doomed to keep moving aimlessly around the arena.

Latini proceeds in obscure imagery to foretell Dante's future. The malicious ingrates who of old descended from Fiesole will be his enemies. They are reputed to be blind, avaricious, envious and proud. Let him beware, he warns, not to be stained by them. Mark Musa suggests that in this speech between the two, there is sexual imagery indicative of the act of sodomy.

According to John D. Sinclair, Dante respected Latini immensely but nonetheless felt it necessary to place him with the sodomites since, according to Sinclair, such behaviour by Latini was well known in Florence at the time. The squalor of Latini's sin and penalty is nevertheless painful for Dante to visualize.

Other critics point to the fact that, outside of The Divine Comedy, there are no firm historical records suggesting Latini was accused of sodomy or homosexual relations—and indeed he seemingly condemns it himself in the Tesoretto. Some, therefore, have suggested that Latini is placed in Canto XV for being violent against art and against his vernacular (Latini wrote in French instead of Florentine, which Dante championed as a literary language in De Vulgari Eloquentia). Yet, Latini started working on the treatise in 1260, before Dante was born, and thus in a very different cultural climate, when French was the language of aristocracy. Perhaps Latini is there to demonstrate and underline that even the greatest of men may be guilty of private sins. Neither objection rules out the possibility that he was guilty of the perceived sin himself; and given the setting and context, it is difficult to see that there can be any doubt, particularly following the discovery in recent years of a love poem, "S'eo son distretto inamoratamente" which Latini sent to another poet, Bondie Dietaiuti, who replied with another love poem.

== Sources ==
- Julia Bolton Holloway, Twice-Told Tales: Brunetto Latino and Dante Alighieri, Berne: Peter Lang, 1993.
- Barbara Reynolds, Dante: The poet, the political thinker, the man, New York, 2006
- Robert Aldrich; Garry Wotherspoon, eds. (2002). Who's Who in Gay and Lesbian History from Antiquity to World War II. Routledge; London. ISBN 0-415-15983-0.
- Napolitano, David (2013). "Brunetto Latini's Tesoro in print" (PDF). Ex Historia. 5: 19–47. ISSN 2041-0824.
- Turco, Jeffrey. "Restaging Sin in Medieval Florence: Augustine, Brunetto Latini, and the Streetscape of Dante's Vita nuova." Italian Studies 73 (2018): 15–21.
