= Gilles de Paris =

French poet

Gilles de Paris (Aegidius Parisiensis, Giles of Paris) (c. 1160 – 1223/1224) was a French poet of the twelfth century. He is best known for his instructional poem Carolinus, written for the future Louis VIII of France around 1200, when Louis was 13 years old.
