= Collectio canonum Hibernensis =

Latin collection of Continental canon law

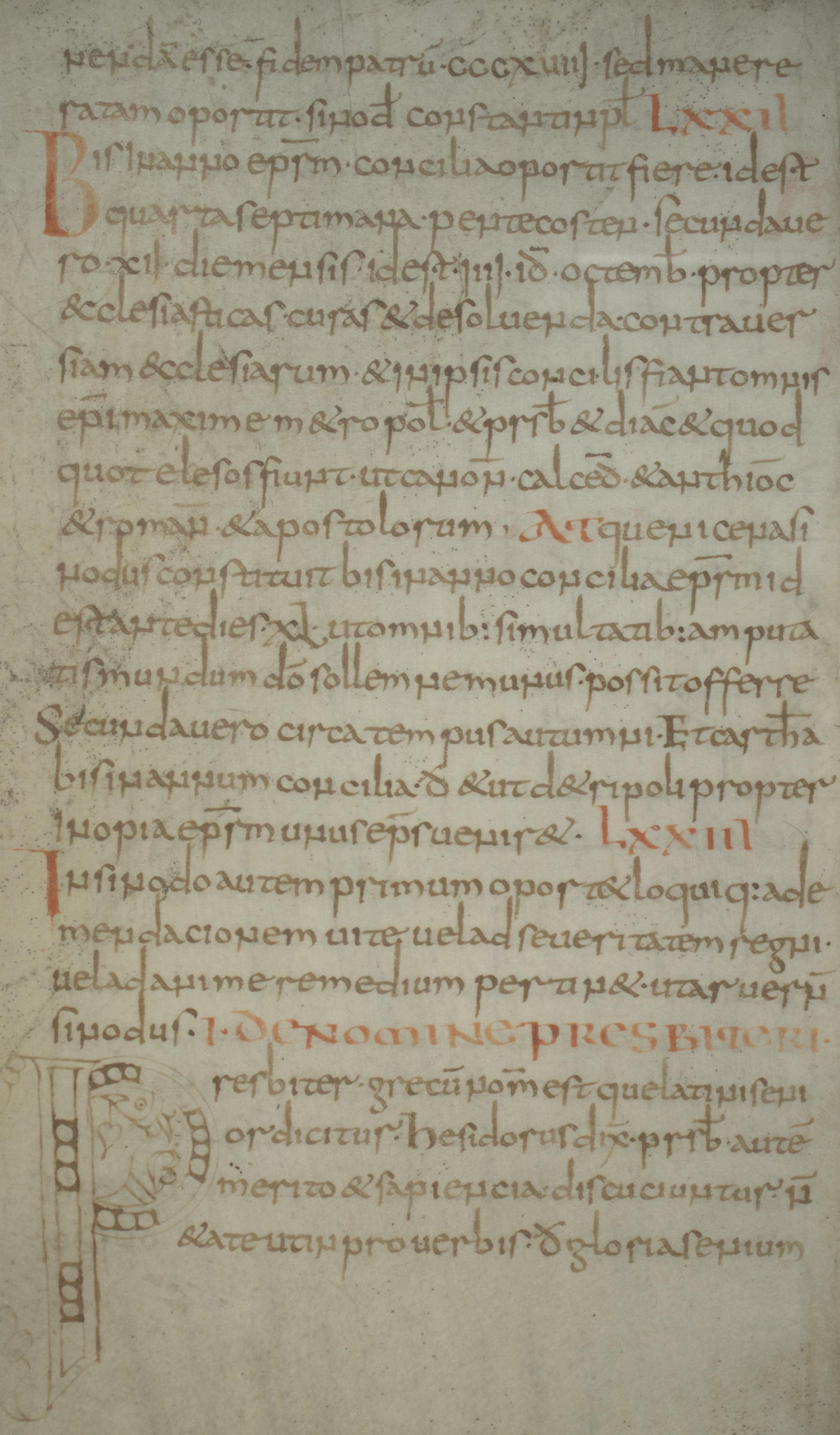
- Folio 15v of eighth-century manuscript 210 of the library at Cologne Cathedral, showing the first chapter of the second book titled De nomine presbiteri at the initial P
- Also known as: Hibernensis, the Irish collection of canons
- Author(s): Cú Chuimne of Iona and Ruben of Dairinis
- Language: medieval Latin
- Date: ca 725
- Genre: canon law collection
- Subject: church law, administration and discipline; theology

The Collectio canonum Hibernensis (English: Irish Collection of Canon law) (or Hib) is a systematic Latin collection of Continental canon law, scriptural and patristic excerpts, and Irish synodal and penitential decrees. Hib is thought to have been compiled by two Irish scholars working in the late 7th or 8th century, Cú Chuimne of Iona (died 747) and Ruben of Dairinis (died 725).

== Overview ==
=== Age and manuscript tradition ===
Hib is one of the oldest systematic canon law collections in Europe. It was compiled in Ireland between 669 and 748. Its compilers are believed to have been Cú Chuimne of Iona (†747) and Ruben of Dairinis (†725). The attribution of Hib to these two men is problematical, however, because it is based solely on a garbled colophon found in a ninth-century manuscript from Brittany with a Corbie and Saint-Germain provenance (now in Paris, Bibliothèque nationale, Lat. 12021). The earliest manuscript witness, according to Rob Meens of Utrecht University, is an early eighth-century collection preserved in Copenhagen (KB 58); Meens in fact refers to the manuscript as a "forerunner" of the Hibernensis. Several recensions of the collection may have circulated in the early Middle Ages, but the two main recensions (called A and B), containing between 65 and 69 books (the division of books varies between manuscripts), seem to date from an early stage of the collection's circulation. Hib circulated widely on the Continent in the eighth and ninth centuries, particularly in Brittany, and had a particularly strong influence on Italian canonistic thought after the ninth century. It may have played a role in the anointment of Pepin the Short as king of Francia in 751, on the advice of Vergilius of Salzburg.

=== Contents ===
Beyond topics typically covered by canon law collections, Hib touches on prayer, consecrated places, martyrs, the ‘substances of men’, blessings, and the soul; indeed, certain chapters often verge on essays on morality. Maurice P. Sheehy said of Hib, ‘as a single document, [it] is probably the most ambitious endeavour to codify Christian life of all the medieval canonical compilations.’ A relatively small portion of the work comprises excerpts from ancient canons and decretals; far more common are citations of Scripture and the Church Fathers―Origen, Jerome, Augustine, Pope Gregory I, and Gregory Nazianzenus being most prominent among these. Its use of Greek Fathers as sources for canon law has been called ‘unique’. Not including quotations inside excerpted patristic writers, Hib contains about 1,000 quotations of Scripture, two-thirds of which come from the Old Testament.

Thomas Charles-Edwards considered the methods by which the compiler(s) of this collection organized their material: "the Hibernensis both contains and relies on exegesis to a far greater extent than do such collections as those of Dionysius Exiguus". The compiler, or ‘exegete’ as Charles-Edwards calls him, was interested not only in presenting decisions, but in finding answers to questions on morality; it was the compiler’s own moral preoccupations, as well as his own interpretation of his sources that determined the shape and content of the collection. The compiler’s use of testimonia and exempla to prove a rule sometimes led him to take a ‘dialectical’ approach to legal questions, in which he would present opposing rules on a single topic and attempt some sort of crude reconciliation, though usually this reconciliation is only ever implied. For some scholars, this has qualified Hib as something of a summa discordantium.

The exegetical and essaic qualities of Hib were signalled by Gabriel le Bras when he argued that Hib is ‘more than a canonical collection, but a repository of scriptural and patristic texts on discipline, which the author accepted as the principal sources of the law. This characteristic of the Hibernensis quite naturally results in its embracing a much wider domain than the other collections: not only the entire domain of the ecclesiastical institution, but also the realm of the social and spiritual life.’

Hib was not the only form of law available in medieval Ireland. A secular law, more commonly known as the Brehon Laws, existed and is often at variance with Hib, although perhaps more surprising is their tendency to overlap.

== Sources for the Collection Canonum Hibernensis ==
Hib was an attempt to make available diverse authorities for use by Canon Jurists. Among the sources included are:

- the Collectio canonum Turonensis
- collections of Gallic and other Continental canons
- ecclesiastical histories
- a definition by Virgil Maro Grammaticus
- a compusticial tract by Pseudo-Theophilus
- spurious 'Acts' of the council of Caesarea
- several quotes from all but one of the works of Isidore of Seville
- so-called dicta of Saint Patrick.

== Editions ==
- Hermann Wasserschleben, Die irische Kanonensammlung (1874, revised 1885). Archive
- Roy Flechner, The Hibernensis: Volume 1. A Study and Edition (2019). Google Books
- Roy Flechner, The Hibernensis: Volume 2. Translation, Commentary, and Indexes (2019). Google Books

== Addenda and Corrigenda to the Editions ==
1. Wasserschleben, 1874
  - p. 2 note 12: FOR 2 Timoth. READ 1 Timoth.
  - p. 64 lines 6–7: FOR contrixisse READ constrinxisse
  - p. 105 lines 15–16: FOR angelio READ angelo
  - p. 134 line 3: AFTER Isaac filio suo ADD Isaac servavit hereditatem Iacob. Item: Iacob servavit partem filio suo Ioseph
  - p. 142 lines 22–24: FOR Si debes aliquid fratri non habenti, quod reddat tibi, sume pignus ab eo, et custodi, ut accipias, quod debeas READ Si debet tibi aliquid frater tuus et non habet, quod reddat tibi, sume pignus ab eo, et custodi, ut accipias, quod debet
  - p. 200 line 17: FOR malitia READ malitiam
  - p. 205 line 19: FOR occidisse READ accidisse
  - p. 209 line 13: FOR item in habitu READ item: Debent esse in habitu
  - p. 233 line 12: FOR dicitur ut READ dicitur: tolle calciamenta locus enim in quo et reliqua. Ita et Iosue ut
2. Wasserschleben, 1885
  - p. 47 line 25: FOR evangelico READ evangelio
  - p. 105 line 12: FOR partribus READ patribus
  - p. 112 line 22: FOR Isaac Iacob READ Isaac servavit hereditatem Iacob
  - p. 204 line 2: FOR dicitur ut READ dicitur: tolle calciamenta locus enim in quo et reliqua. Ita et Iosue ut
3. Flechner, 2019
  - p. 206 line 20: ADD cf. Gen. 9:25
  - p. 207 line 1: ADD cf. Gen. 25:6
  - p. 282 line 2: ADD cf. Jerome, Ep. 53 (CSEL 54/1, p. 448)
  - p. 307 line 10: ADD cf. Num. 10:29–32
  - p. 460 line 9: FOR apostolus READ apostolos
  - p. 460 line 15: FOR Hiromonus READ Hironimus / Hieronimus (as in app. crit.)
  - p. 820 line 8: FOR apostle READ apostles
  - p. 983 line 1: FOR ennarationes READ enarrationes
