= Huang Zongxi =

Chinese naturalist, political theorist, philosopher, poet and soldier

- 黃宗羲
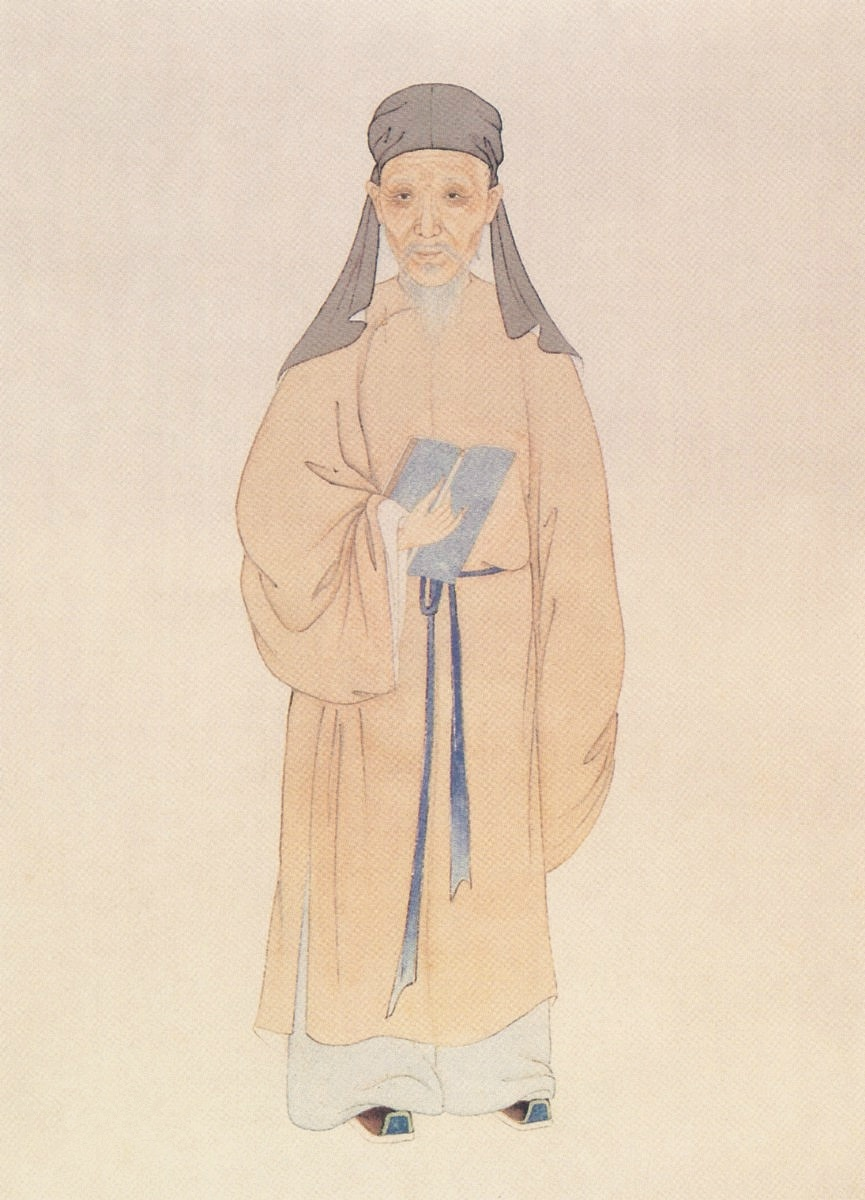
- Huang Zongxi.
- Born: September 24, 1610; Yuyao, Zhejiang, China
- Died: August 12, 1695 (aged 84); Yuyao, Zhejiang, China
- Occupations: Naturalist, political theorist, philosopher, soldier
- Notable work: Waiting for the Dawn; Record of the Ming Scholars
- Children: Huang Baiyao; Huang Zhengyi; Huang Baijia
- Parent: Huang Zongsu (father)
- Relatives: Huang Zongyan (brother); Huang Zonghui (brother)

Chinese name
- Traditional Chinese: 黃宗羲
- Simplified Chinese: 黄宗羲
Transcriptions
Standard Mandarin
- Hanyu Pinyin: Huáng Zōngxī
- Wade–Giles: Huang^{2} Tsung^{1}-hsi^{1}
- IPA: [xwǎŋ tsʊ́ŋ.ɕí]

Taichong
- Chinese: 太冲
Transcriptions
Standard Mandarin
- Hanyu Pinyin: Taìchōng

Debing
- Chinese: 德冰
Transcriptions
Standard Mandarin
- Hanyu Pinyin: Débīng

Nanlei
- Chinese: 南雷
Transcriptions
Standard Mandarin
- Hanyu Pinyin: Nánleí

Lizhou Laoren
- Chinese: 梨洲老人
Transcriptions
Standard Mandarin
- Hanyu Pinyin: lízhōu Lǎorén

Lizhou Shanren
- Chinese: 梨洲山人
Transcriptions
Standard Mandarin
- Hanyu Pinyin: lízhōu Shānrén

Huang Zongxi (Chinese: 黃宗羲; September 24, 1610 – August 12, 1695), courtesy name Taichong (太冲), was a Chinese naturalist, political theorist, philosopher, and soldier during the latter part of the Ming dynasty into the early part of the Qing.

He was the son of an adherent of the Donglin Movement who died in prison. In 1626, the teenaged Huang became a disciple of the philosopher Liu Zongzhou. In 1631, he started studying Chinese history. Huang was politically active as a Ming loyalist until his retirement in 1649, spending the rest of his life in study. A warrant for his arrest was issued after the rise to power of Ruan Dacheng, but he avoided capture through uncertain ways. He may have fled China to seek political refuge in Japan.

Huang's political text Waiting for the Dawn condemns selfish autocratic rule, and declares that the world should belong to the people. He argued that all laws and regulatory bodies should be an outgrowth of local needs, not imposed by leaders with a political agenda. He also described the need for a fiscal reform in the country, and a need for equitable land distribution.

== Biography ==
Huang was a native of Yuyao in Zhejiang province. He was the son of Huang Zunsu, an official of the Ming court and an adherent of the Donglin Movement who died in prison after opposing the powerful eunuch Wei Zhongxian.

Huang Zongxi became a licentiate in 1623 at the age of 14, and in the same year followed his father to Beijing, where his father held a post as a censor. The struggle between the Donglin faction and the eunuchs was reaching a climax during this period, and as a result the elder Huang was dismissed from office in 1625 and the two returned home. Soon after, Huang Zongxi was married to Ye Baolin. When Huang Zunsu was traveling in custody to Beijing in 1626, he introduced his son to Liu Zongzhou, a noted philosopher of the Wang Yangming school. Huang Zongxi then became a devoted disciple of Liu and a proponent of the Wang Yangming school.

Huang Zunsu was put to death in 1626. When a new emperor ascended the throne two years later, Huang Zongxi set off for the capital to protest the execution of his father. Even before he arrived, however, the eunuch faction was destroyed and those who died under it were bestowed with honors. Still, Huang engaged in daring acts of vengeance in the capital, gaining the respect of many. In accordance with his father's last wishes, he in 1631 devoted himself to studying Chinese history. In 1633, Huang completed the Shilu, or "Veritable Records" of the first thirteen reigns of the Ming dynasty.

After the beginning of the Qing dynasty and the rise to power of Ruan Dacheng, arrest warrants were issued for descendants of Donglin members, including Huang Zongxi. Liang Qichao later speculated that Huang avoided capture by fleeing to Japan during this period, but the evidence consists of only one poem. Huang assisted Ming loyalist forces until his retirement in 1649. Thereafter, Huang devoted himself to study and lived near his native home for much of the rest of his life. He died in 1695, at the age of 84.

== Study ==
Huang was notable for being one of the first Neo-Confucians to stress the need for constitutional law. He also openly advocated the belief that ministers should be openly critical of their emperor; and that rulers held a responsibility to their country. Moreover, an emperor should respect the concerns of his prime minister and head of the Imperial College. In local areas, the local gentry, scholars, and students should gather and form an assembly to discuss issues openly with local magistrates and officials.

Huang's first work was not completed until the age of 52, and the work's fuller influence was not felt until the declining years of the Qing dynasty.

== Major works ==
=== Waiting for the Dawn ===
Waiting for the Dawn (Chinese: 明夷待訪錄) was a summary of ideas about political reform that had been advanced by various scholars since the reign of Wanli (1573–1619). The political tract begins with a condemnation of selfish autocratic rule, and declares that the world should belong to the people. The third and fifth section of the work, "On Laws" and "Schools", respectively, are particularly famous. In the former, Huang declares that all laws and regulatory bodies should be an outgrowth of local needs, not imposed by leaders with a political agenda. In the latter, he advocates using the education system as a semiofficial forum for educated opinion on public affairs.

In the sixth and seventh sections of the work, entitled "Selecting Good Men", Huang also lays out his ideas for reform of the Imperial examination system. In later sections, he discusses equitable distribution of landholdings, the division between men of civil and military background, fiscal reform, and the problem of Eunuch power during the Ming dynasty.

=== Record of the Ming Scholars ===
The Record of the Ming Scholars (明儒学案; 明儒學案; Mingru Xue'an) is a systematic survey of all of the important schools of thought that arose during the Ming Dynasty. It explored their interconnection and geographical distribution, and critically evaluated on the life and teachings of important men from each school. It is usually regarded as the first great history of Chinese philosophy. The work was later lauded by Liang Qichao as a new kind of historiography.

At the time of his death, Huang Zongxi left behind an uncompleted survey of the Song and Yuan dynasties.

== Translations ==
- Bary, Wm. Theodore de (1994). Waiting for the Dawn A Plan for the Prince. New York: Columbia University Press. ISBN 0231080972.
