= Greeks in Italy =

Greek presence in Italy

Greeks in Italy Έλληνες της Ιταλίας
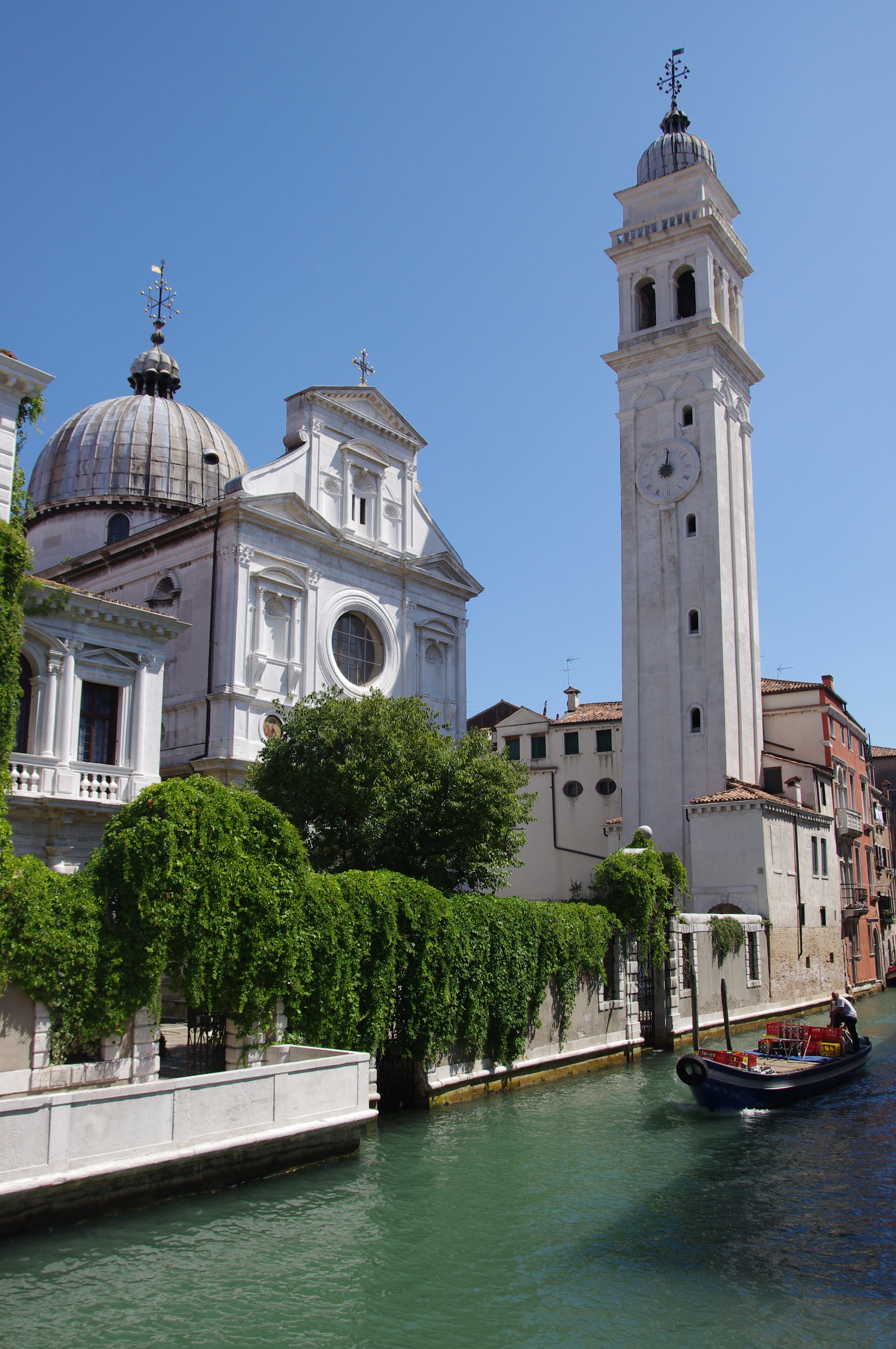
- San Giorgio dei Greci, Venice

Total population
- 90.000 - 110.000^{d}

Regions with significant populations
- Apulia: 54,278 (2005)
- Calabria: 22,636 (2010)
- Lombardy: 1,919 (2024)
- Sicily: 500 (2012)

Languages
- Italian, Greek (Griko)

Greeks in Italy have been present since the migrations of traders and colonial foundations in the 8th century BC, continuing down to the present time. Nowadays, there is an ethnic minority known as the Griko people, who live in the Southern Italian regions of Calabria (Province of Reggio Calabria) and Apulia, especially the peninsula of Salento, within the ancient Magna Graecia region, who speak a distinctive dialect of Greek called Griko. They are believed to be remnants of the ancient and medieval Greek communities, who have lived in the south of Italy for centuries. A Greek community has long existed in Venice as well, the current centre of the Greek Orthodox Archdiocese of Italy and Malta, which in addition was a Byzantine province until the 10th century and held territory in Morea and Crete until the 17th century. Alongside this group, a smaller number of more recent migrants from Greece lives in Italy, forming an expatriate community in the country. Today many Greeks in Southern Italy follow Italian customs and culture, experiencing cultural assimilation.

== Ancient ==
Greek Diaspora in 6th century BC

In the 8th and 7th centuries BC, for various reasons, including demographic crisis (famine, overcrowding, climate change, etc.), the search for new commercial outlets and ports, and expulsion from their homeland, Greeks began a large colonization drive, including southern Italy.

In this same time, Greek colonies were established in places as widely separated as the eastern coast of the Black Sea and Massalia (Marseille). They included settlements in Sicily and the coastal areas of the southern part of the Italian peninsula. The Romans called the area of Sicily and the foot of the boot of Italy Magna Graecia (Latin, "Greater Greece"), since it was so densely inhabited by Greeks. The ancient geographers differed on whether the term included Sicily or merely Apulia and Calabria — Strabo being the most prominent advocate of the wider definitions.

== Medieval and Renaissance ==
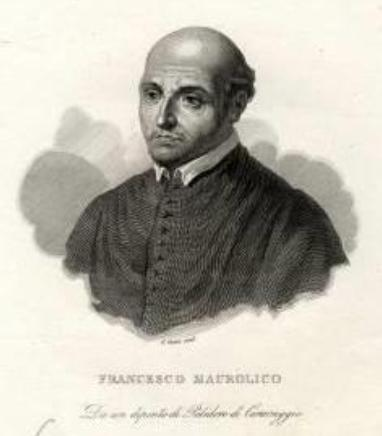
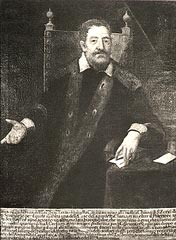
16th-century Greek migrants in Italy. Left: Francesco Maurolico (c. 1494–1575) was born in Messina, Sicily to a Greek family who had settled there following the Ottoman invasion of Constantinople. Right: Thomas Flanginis (c. 1578–1648) a wealthy Greek lawyer and merchant in Venice, who founded the Flanginian School, a Greek college where many teachers were trained.

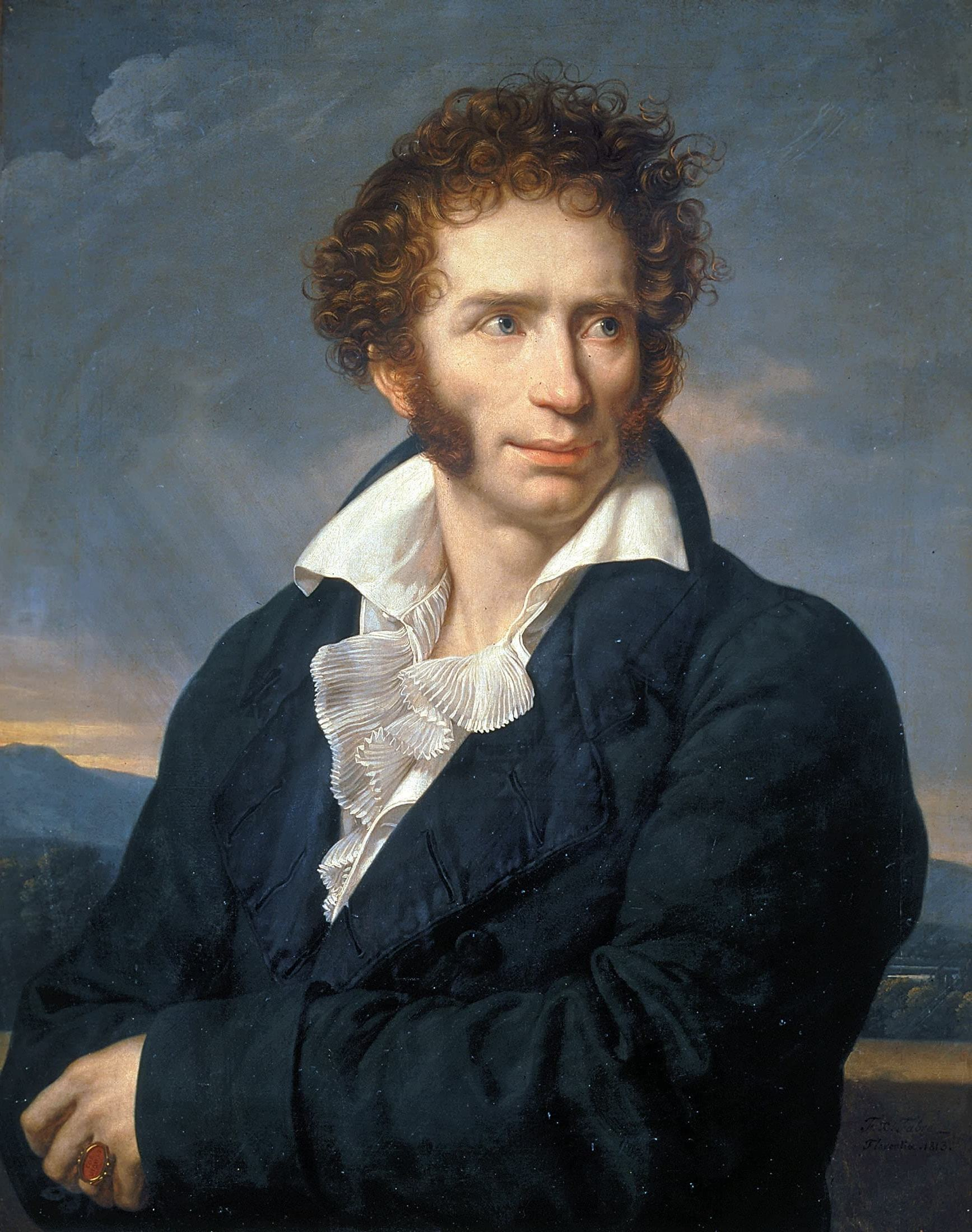
Ugo Foscolo (1778–1827), a prominent Greek-Italian

During the Early Middle Ages, new waves of Greeks came to Magna Graecia from Greece and Asia Minor, as southern Italy remained governed by the Eastern Roman Empire until the late 11th century. However, they would stay a larger minor ethnic group in the south of Italy. Although most of the Greek inhabitants of southern Italy assimilated and no longer spoke Greek, a small Griko-speaking minority still exists today in Apulia, mostly in Salento, and in Calabria. Griko is the name of a language combining ancient Doric, Byzantine Greek, and Italian elements, spoken by people in the Magna Graecia region. There is rich oral tradition and Griko folklore, limited now, though once numerous, to only a few thousand people, most of them having become absorbed into the surrounding Italian element. Records of Magna Graecia or southern Italy being predominantly Greek-speaking date as late as the 11th century.

The migration of Byzantine Greek scholars and other emigres from Byzantium during the decline of the Byzantine Empire and mainly after the fall of Constantinople in 1453 until the 16th century, is considered by modern scholars as crucial in the revival of Greek and Roman studies, arts and sciences, and subsequently in the development of Renaissance humanism. These emigres were grammarians, humanists, poets, writers, printers, lecturers, musicians, astronomers, architects, academics, artists, scribes, philosophers, scientists, politicians and theologians.

In the decades following the fall of Constantinople, many Greeks began to settle in territories of the Republic of Venice, including in Venice itself. In 1479 there were between 4000 and 5000 Greek residents in Venice. Moreover, it was one of the economically strongest Greek communities of that time outside the Ottoman Empire. In November 1494 the Greeks in Venice asked permission and were permitted to found a confraternity, the Scuola dei Greci, a philanthropic and religious society which had its own committee and officers to represent the interests of the Greek community. This was the first official recognition of the legal status of the Greek minority by the Venetian authorities. In 1539 the Greeks of Venice were permitted to begin building their own church, the San Giorgio dei Greci which still stands in the centre of Venice in the present day on the Rio dei Greci.

== Modern Italy ==
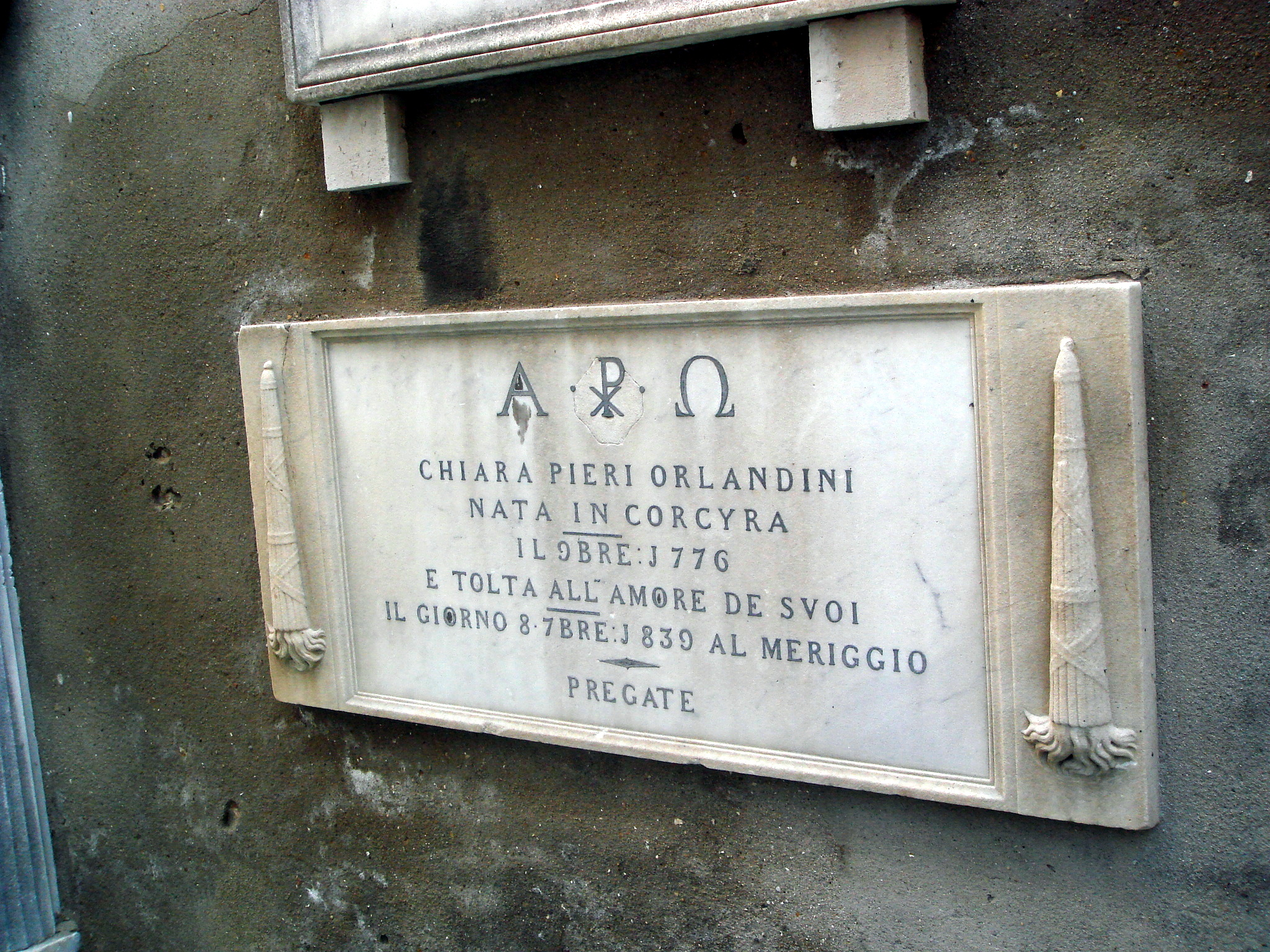
Grave of Chiara Pieri Orlandini of Corcyra (1776–1839), Venice

Although most of the Greek inhabitants of Southern Italy became entirely Latinized during the Middle Ages (as many ancient colonies like Paestum had already been in the 4th century BC), parts of Greek culture and language have remained.

Thus, for example, Greeks sought refuge in the region in the 16th and 17th centuries in reaction to the conquest of the Peloponnese by the Ottoman Turks, especially after the fall of Coroni (1534). The Greeks from Coroni - the so-called Coronians - belonged to the nobility and brought with them substantial movable property. They were granted special privileges and given tax exemptions. Another part of the Greeks that moved to Italy came from the Mani region of the Peloponnese. The Maniots were known for their proud military traditions and for their bloody vendettas (another portion of these Greeks moved to Corsica; cf. the Corsican vendettas).

When the PNF under Benito Mussolini gained power in 1922, they persecuted the Greek-speakers in Italy. Today the Italian Greek is included in UNESCO's Red Book of Endangered Languages.

The flag of the greek minority of Messina, Sicily

The city of Messina is home to a small Greek-speaking minority, which arrived from the Peloponnese between 1533 and 1534 when fleeing the expansion of the Ottoman Empire. They were officially recognised in 2012.

== Griko people ==
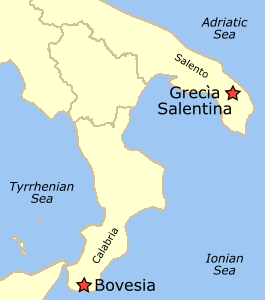
Griko-speaking areas in Salento and Calabria

The Griko people are a population group in Italy of ultimately Greek origin which still exists today in the Italian regions of Calabria and Apulia. The Griko people traditionally spoke the Griko language, a form of the Greek language combining ancient Doric and Byzantine Greek elements. Some believe that the origins of the Griko language may ultimately be traced to the colonies of Magna Graecia. Greeks were the dominant population element of some regions in the south of Italy, especially Calabria, the Salento, parts of Lucania and Sicily until the 12th century. Over the past centuries the Griko have been heavily influenced by the Catholic Church and Italian culture and as a result, many Griko have become largely assimilated into mainstream Italian culture, though once numerous, the Griko are now limited, most of them having become absorbed into the surrounding Italian element. The Griko language is severely endangered due to language shift towards Italian and large-scale internal migration to the cities in recent decades. The Griko community is currently estimated at 60,000 members.

== Immigrants ==
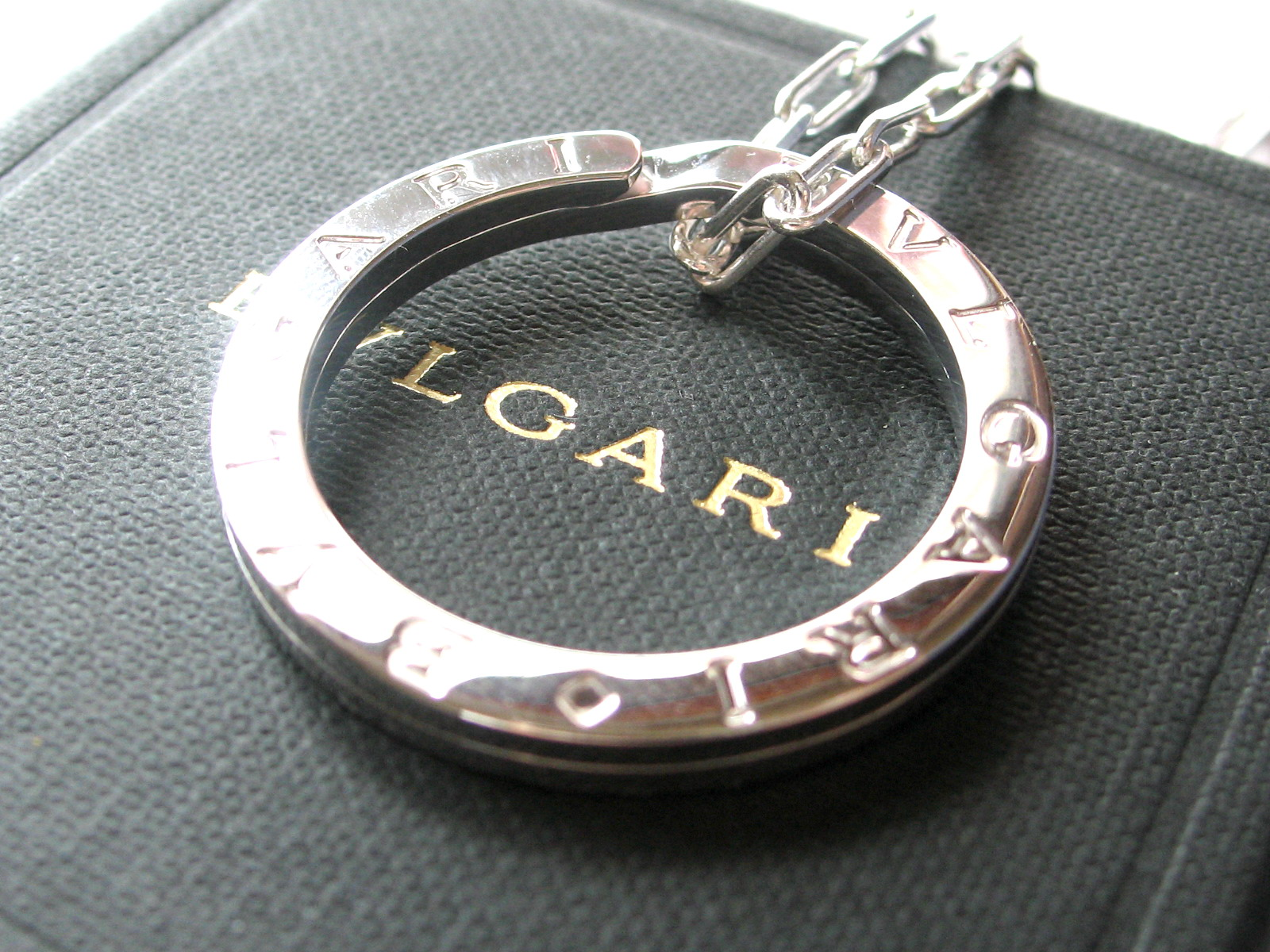
The Bulgari brand was founded by Sotirio Bulgari, a Greek immigrant to Italy

After World War II, a large number of Greeks immigrated to countries abroad, mostly to The United States, Canada, Australia, New Zealand, The United Kingdom, Argentina, Brazil, Norway, Germany, The United Arab Emirates, and Singapore. However, a smaller number of diaspora migrants from Greece entered Italy from World War II onwards, today the Greek diaspora community consists of some 30,000 people, the majority of whom are located in Rome and Central Italy.

== Notable Greeks in Italy ==
- Peter of Candia (1339–1410), antipope
- Pope Innocent VIII (1432–1492)
- Francesco Maurolico (1494–1575), mathematician and astronomer
- Gioachino Greco (1600–1634), chess player
- Nicholas Kalliakis (1645–1707), philosopher
- Andreas Musalus (1665–1721), mathematician and philosopher
- Simone Stratigo (1733–1824), mathematician and natural science expert
- Ugo Foscolo (1778–1827), writer, revolutionary and poet
- Constantino Brumidi (1805–1880), historical painter
- Francesco Crispi (1818–1901), prime minister of Italy
- Matilde Serao (1856–1927), journalist and novelist
- Sotirios Voulgaris (1857–1932), founder of Bulgari jewelry
- Luigi Pirandello (1867–1936), dramatist and Nobel Prize winner in Literature
- Giorgio de Chirico (1888–1978), artist and writer
- Salvatore Quasimodo (1901–1968), poet, translator and Nobel Prize winner in Literature
- Antonella Lualdi (1931–2023), actress and singer
- Sylva Koscina (1933–1994), actress
- Ovidio Assonitis (born 1943), director, screenwriter and film producer
- Fiorella Kostoris (born 1945), economist
- Demetrio Stratos (1945–1979), singer
- Antonella Interlenghi (born 1960), actress
- Anna Kanakis (1962–2023), actress and model
- Valeria Golino (born 1965), actress, model and film director
- Virginia Sanjust di Teulada (born 1977), former television announcer and host
- Chiara Gensini (born 1982), actress
- Nicolas Vaporidis (born 1982), actor
- Ria Antoniou (born 1988), model and actress
- Ludovica Caramis (born 1991), model

== See also ==
- Calabrian Greek dialect
- Colonies in antiquity
- Greek coinage of Italy and Sicily
- Greek Orthodox Archdiocese of Italy and Malta
- Griko language
- Magna Graecia
- Grecìa Salentina
- Bovesia
