= Greek scholars in the Renaissance =

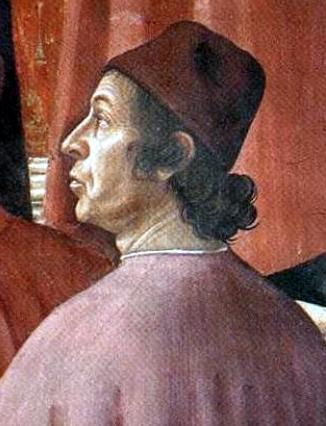
Demetrios Chalkokondyles (brother of Laonikos Chalkokondyles) (1424–1511) was a Greek Renaissance scholar, Humanist and teacher of Greek and Platonic philosophy.

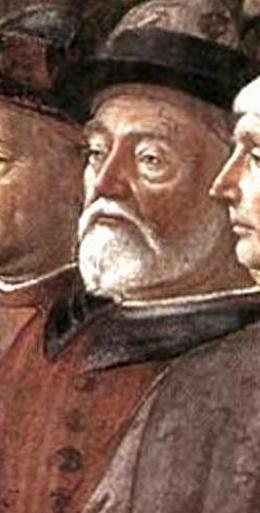
John Argyropoulos (1415–1487) was a Greek Renaissance scholar who played a prominent role in the revival of Greek philosophy in Italy.

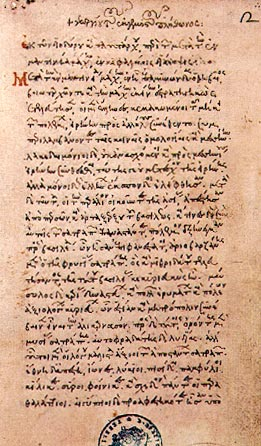
One of Georgius Gemistus (Plethon)'s manuscripts, in Greek, written in the early 15th century.

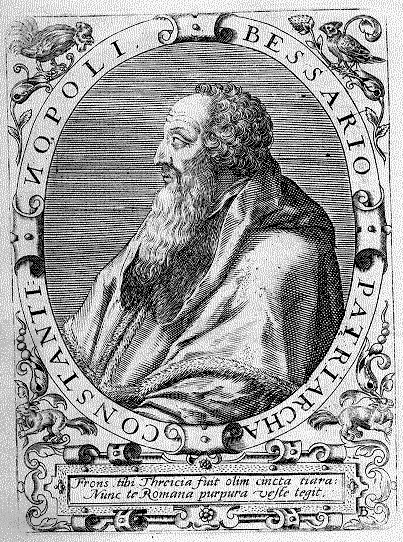
Cardinal Bessarion (1395–1472) of Trebizond, Pontus was a Greek scholar, statesman, and cardinal and one of the leading figures in the rise of the intellectual Renaissance.

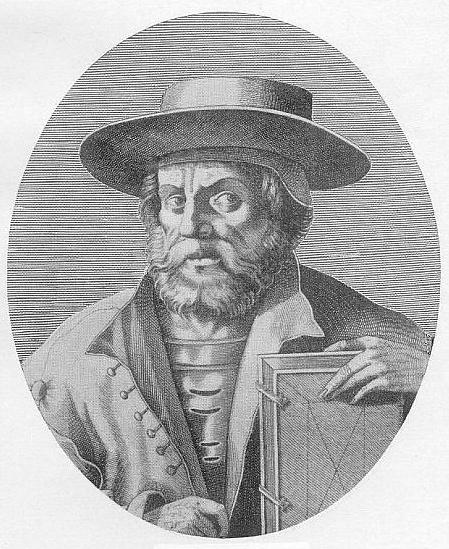
Manuel Chrysoloras

The migration waves of Byzantine Greek scholars and émigrés in the period following the end of the Byzantine Empire in 1453 are considered by many scholars key to the revival of Greek studies that led to the development of Renaissance humanism and science. These émigrés brought to Western Europe the relatively well-preserved remnants and accumulated knowledge of their own (Greek) civilization, which had mostly not survived the Early Middle Ages in the West. The Encyclopædia Britannica claims: "Many modern scholars also agree that the exodus of Greeks to Italy as a result of this event marked the end of the Middle Ages and the beginning of the Renaissance," although few scholars date the start of the Italian Renaissance this late.

== History ==
The main role of Byzantine scholars within Renaissance humanism was the teaching of the Greek language to their Western counterparts in universities or privately, together with the spread of ancient texts. Their forerunners were Barlaam of Calabria (Bernardo Massari) and Leonzio Pilato, two translators who were both born in Calabria in southern Italy and educated in the Greek language. The impact of these two scholars on the humanists was indisputable.

By 1500 there was a Greek-speaking community of about 5,000 in Venice. The Venetians also ruled Crete, Dalmatia, and scattered islands and port cities of the former empire, the populations of which were augmented by refugees from other Byzantine provinces who preferred Venetian to Ottoman governance. Crete was especially notable for the Cretan School of icon-painting, which after 1453 became the most important in the Greek world.

After the peak of the Italian Renaissance in the first decades of the 16th century, the flow of information reversed, and Greek scholars in Italy were employed to oppose Turkish expansion into former Byzantine lands in Greece, prevent the Protestant Reformation spreading there and help bring the Eastern Churches back into communion with Rome. In 1577, Gregory XIII founded the Collegio Pontificio Greco as a college in Rome to receive young Greeks belonging to any nation in which the Greek Rite was used, and consequently for Greek refugees in Italy as well as the Ruthenians and Malchites of Egypt and Syria. The construction of the College and Church of S. Atanasio, joined by a bridge over the Via dei Greci, began that year.

Although ideas from ancient Rome already enjoyed popularity with the scholars of the 14th century and their importance to the Renaissance was undeniable, the lessons of Greek learning brought by Byzantine intellectuals changed the course of humanism and the Renaissance itself. While Greek learning affected all the subjects of the studia humanitatis, history and philosophy in particular were profoundly affected by the texts and ideas brought from Byzantium. History was changed by the re-discovery and spread of Greek historians' writings, and this knowledge of Greek historical treatises helped the subject of history become a guide to virtuous living based on the study of past events and people. The effects of this renewed knowledge of Greek history can be seen in the writings of humanists on virtue, which was a popular topic. Specifically, these effects are shown in the examples provided from Greek antiquity that displayed virtue as well as vice.

The philosophy of not only Aristotle but also Plato affected the Renaissance by causing debates over man's place in the universe, the immortality of the soul, and the ability of man to improve himself through virtue. The flourishing of philosophical writings in the 15th century revealed the impact of Greek philosophy and science on the Renaissance. The resonance of these changes lasted through the centuries following the Renaissance not only in the writing of humanists, but also in the education and values of Europe and western society even to the present day.

Deno Geanakopoulos in his work on the contribution of Byzantine Greek scholars to Renaissance has summarised their input into three major shifts to Renaissance thought:

- in early 14th century Florence from the early, central emphasis on rhetoric to one on metaphysical philosophy by means of introducing and reinterpretation of the Platonic texts,
- in Venice-Padua by reducing the dominance of Averroist Aristotle in science and philosophy by supplementing but not completely replacing it with Byzantine traditions which utilised ancient and Byzantine commentators on Aristotle,
- and earlier in the mid-15th century in Rome, through emphasis not on any philosophical school but on the production of more authentic and reliable versions of Greek texts relevant to all fields of humanism and science, and with respect to the Greek Fathers of the Church. Hardly less important was their direct or indirect influence on the exegesis of the New Testament itself through Cardinal Bessarion's inspiration of Lorenzo Valla's biblical emendations of the Latin vulgate in the light of the Greek text.

== Scholars ==
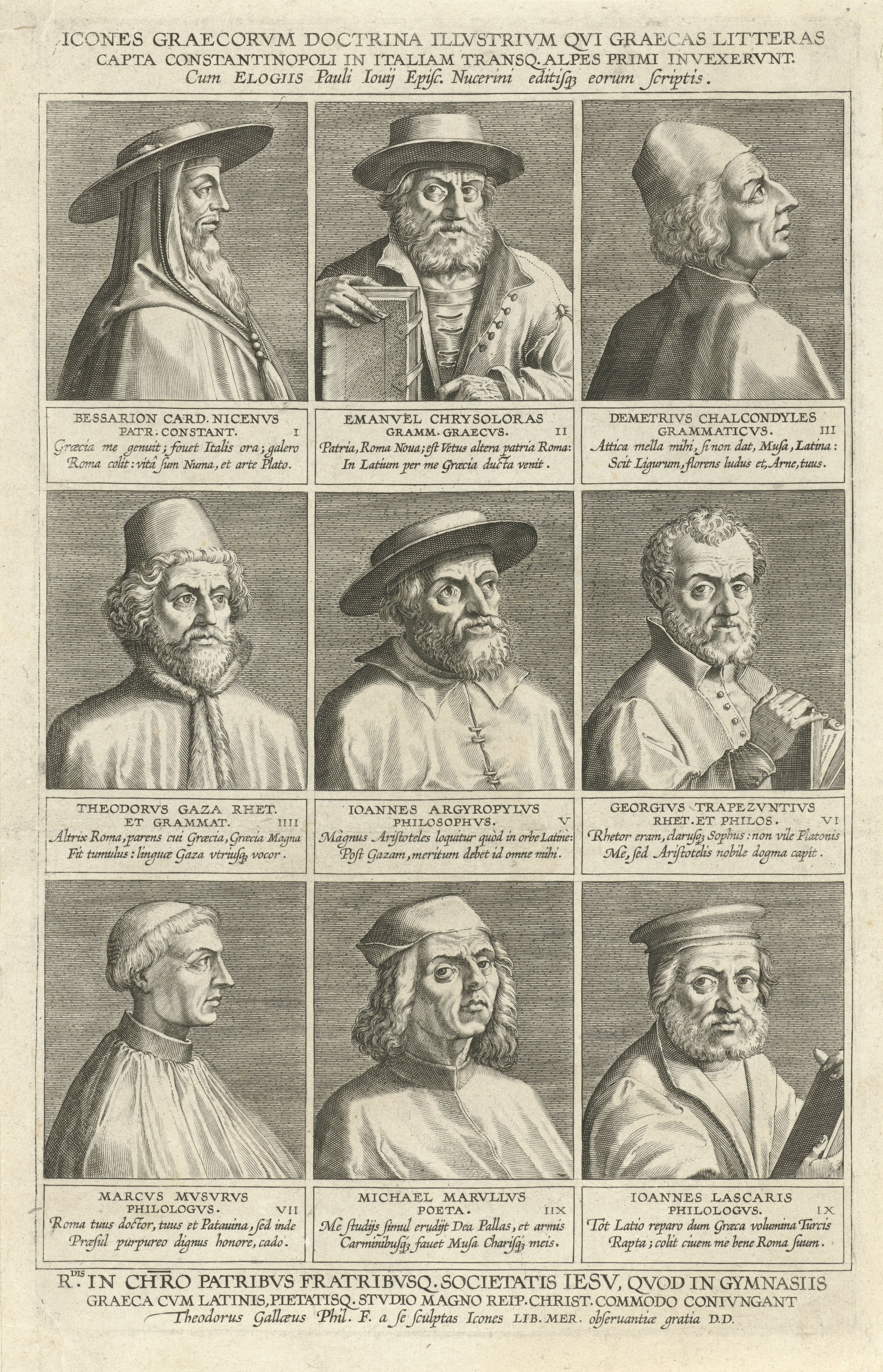
Nine portraits of Greek Renaissance scholars; taken from Icones et elogia novem Graecorum doctrina illustrium, Antwerp, 1599.

- Leo Allatius (c. 1586 – 1669), Rome, librarian of the library of Vatican
- George Amiroutzes (1400–1470), Florence, Aristotelian
- Henry Aristippus of Calabria (1105–10 – 1162)
- Michael Apostolius (c. 1420 – after 1474 or 1486), Rome
- Arsenius Apostolius (c. 1468 – 1538), Venice, bishop of Monemvasia
- John Argyropoulos (c. 1415 – 1487), Universities of Florence, Rome
- Simon Atumano (14th century), Bishop of Gerace in Calabria
- Bessarion (1403–1472), Catholic cardinal
- Barlaam of Seminara (c. 1290–1348), he taught Petrarch some rudiments of Greek language
- Zacharias Calliergi (fl. 1499–1515), Rome
- Laonicus Chalcocondyles (c. 1430 – c. 1470), historian, Athens
- Demetrius Chalcondyles (1423–1511), Padua, Florence, Milan
- Theofilos Chalcocondylis, Florence
- Manuel Chrysoloras (c. 1355 – 1415), Florence, Pavia, Rome, Venice, Milan
- John Chrysoloras, scholar and diplomat: relative of Manuel Chrysoloras, patron of Francesco Filelfo
- Andronicus Contoblacas, Basel, teacher of Johann Reuchlin
- Johannes Crastonis (d. after 1497), Modena, Greek-Latin dictionary
- Andronicus Callistus (1400 – c. 1476), Rome, Bologna, Florence, Paris, cousin of Theodorus Gaza
- Demetrius Cydones (1324–1398), Mesazon of the Byzantine Empire
- Mathew Devaris (fl. 1552–1550), Rome
- Demetrius Ducas (c. 1480 – c. 1527), Spain
- Elia del Medigo (c. 1458 – c. 1493), Venice, Rome, Padua, Jewish philosopher
- Antonios Eparchos (1491–1571), Venice, scholar and poet
- Antonio de Ferraris (c. 1444 – 1517), academic, doctor and humanist
- Theodorus Gaza (c. 1398 – c. 1475), first dean of the University of Ferrara, Naples and Rome
- George Gemistos Plethon (c. 1355/1360 – 1452/54), teacher of Bessarion
- George of Trebizond (1395–1486), Venice, Florence, Rome
- George Hermonymus (before 1435 – after 1503), University of Paris, teacher of Erasmus, Reuchlin, Budaeus and Jacques Lefèvre d'Étaples
- Georgios Kalafatis (ca. 1652 – ca. 1720), Greek professor of theoretical and practical medicine
- Andreas Musalus (ca. 1665/6 – ca. 1721), Greek professor of mathematics, philosopher and architectural theorist
- Nicholas Kalliakis (Nicolai Calliachius) (1645–1707), a Greek scholar and philosopher who flourished in Italy.
- Mathaeos Kamariotis (d. 1490), Constantinople
- Isidore of Kiev (1385–1463)
- Ioannis Kigalas (ca. 1622 – 1687), Greek scholar and professor of Philosophy and Logic
- Ioannis Kottounios (c. 1577 – 1658), Padua
- Konstantinos Kallokratos (b. 1589), Calabria
- Constantine Lascaris (1434–1501), University of Messina
- Janus Lascaris or Rhyndacenus (c. 1445 – 1535), Rome
- Leonard of Chios (c. 1395/96 – c. 1458), Greek-born Roman Catholic prelate
- Nikolaos Loukanis (16th century), Venice
- Maximus the Greek (c. 1475 – 1556) studied in Italy before moving to Russia
- Maximos Margunios (1549–1602), Venice
- Marcus Musurus (c. 1470 – 1517), University of Padua
- Michael Tarchaniota Marullus (с. 1458 – 1500), Ancona and Florence, friend and pupil of Jovianus Pontanus
- Leonardos Philaras (1595–1673), an early advocate for Greek independence
- Maximus Planudes (c. 1260 – c. 1305), Rome, Venice, anthologist, mathematician, grammarian, theologian
- Franciscus Portus (1511–1581), Venice, Ferrara, Geneva
- John Servopoulos (fl. 1484–1500), scholar, professor, Oxford
- Nikolaos Sophianos (c. 1500 – after 1551), Rome, Venice: scholar and geographer, creator of the Totius Graeciae Descriptio
- Nicholas Leonicus Thomaeus (1456–1531), Venice, Padua
- Iakovos Trivolis (d. 1547), Venice
- Gregory Tifernas (1414–1462), Paris, teacher of Jacques Lefèvre d'Étaples and Robert Gaguin
- Gerasimos Vlachos (1607–1685), Venice
- Francesco Maurolico (1494–1575), mathematician and astronomer from Sicily

== Painting and music ==
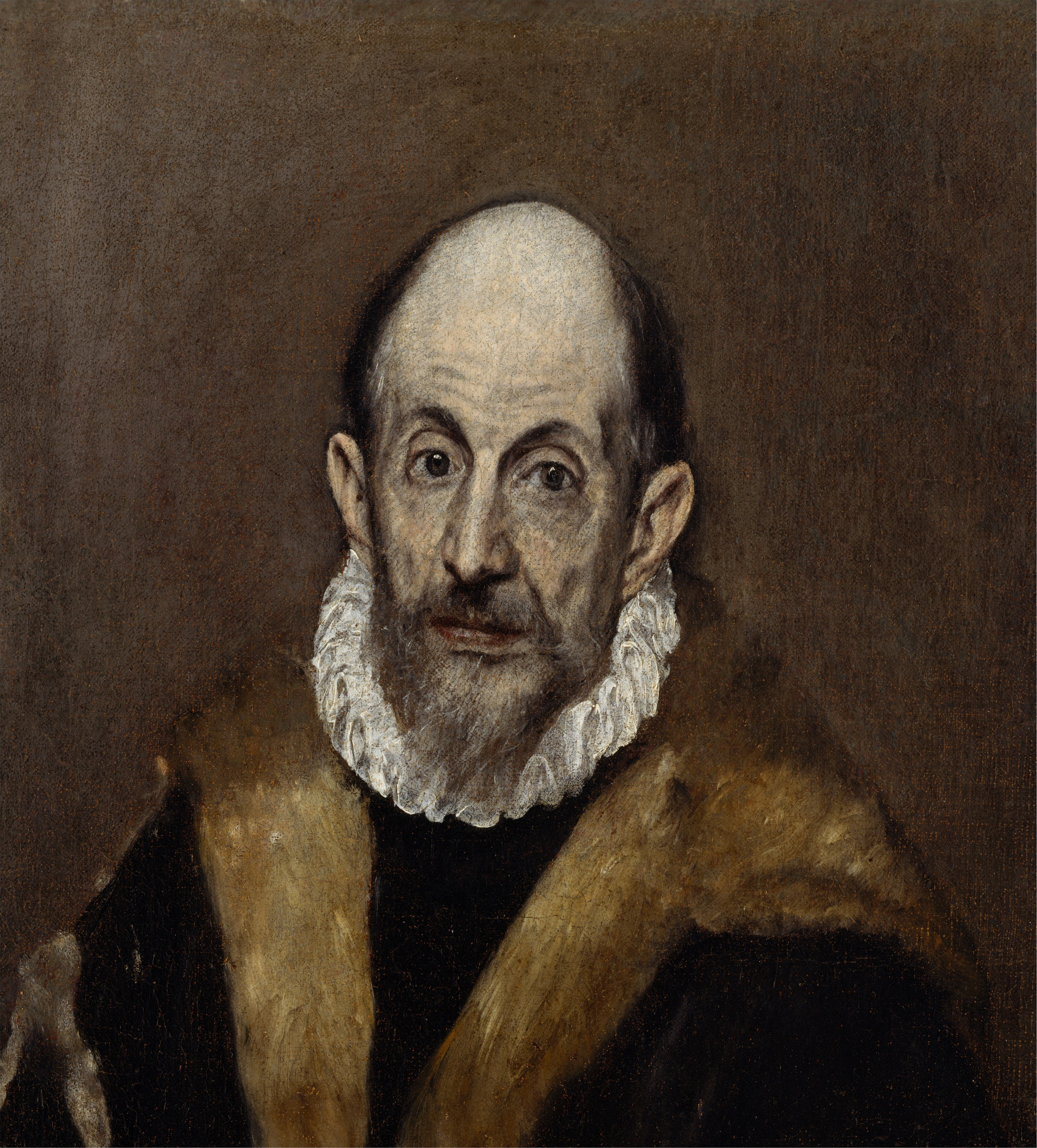
El Greco (literally 'the Greek') the nickname for the Cretan painter Dominikos Theotokopoulos.

- Marco Basaiti (c. 1470 – c. 1530), painter, Venice
- Belisario Corenzio (c. 1558–1643), painter, Napoli
- Michael Damaskenos (1530/35–1592/93), Venice, Cretan painter
- Georgios Klontzas (1535-1608) Cretan painter
- Thomas Flanginis (1578–1648), Venice, funded the establishment of the Flanginian Greek school for teachers
- El Greco (1541–1614), the nickname for the Cretan painter Dominikos Theotokopoulos, Italy, Spain
- Francisco Leontaritis (1518 – c. 1572), Italy, Bavaria: singer and composer
- Anna Notaras (d. 1507), Venice, first Greek printing press
- Angelos Pitzamanos (1467–1535), Cretan painter, Otranto, Southern Italy
- Janus Plousiadenos (c. 1429 – c. 1500), Venice, hymnographer and composer
- Theodore Poulakis (1622–1692), Venice, painter
- Emmanuel Tzanes (1610–1690), Venice, Cretan painter
- John Rhosos (d. 1498), Rome, Venice well-known scribe
- Antonio Vassilacchi (1556–1629), painter from Milos worked in Venice with Paolo Veronese

== See also ==
- Byzantine art
- Cretan School
- Byzantine science
- French humanism, a movement influenced by Greek scholars working in France
- Greek College
- List of Byzantine scholars
- Renaissance humanism

== Sources ==
- Deno J. Geanakoplos, Byzantine East and Latin West: Two worlds of Christendom in Middle Ages and renaissance. The Academy Library Harper & Row Publishers, New York, 1966.
- Deno J. Geanakoplos, (1958) A Byzantine looks at the renaissance, Greek, Roman and Byzantine Studies 1 (2);pp:157-62.
- Jonathan Harris, Greek Émigrés in the West, 1400-1520, Camberley: Porphyrogenitus, 1995.
- Louise Ropes Loomis (1908) The Greek Renaissance in Italy The American Historical Review, 13(2);pp:246-258.
- John Monfasani Byzantine Scholars in Renaissance Italy: Cardinal Bessarion and Other Émigrés: Selected Essays, Aldershot, Hampshire: Variorum, 1995.
- Steven Runciman, The fall of Constantinople, 1453. Cambridge University press, Cambridge 1965.
- Fotis Vassileiou & Barbara Saribalidou, Short Biographical Lexicon of Byzantine Academics Immigrants to Western Europe, 2007.
- Dimitri Tselos (1956) A Greco-Italian School of Illuminators and Fresco Painters: Its Relation to the Principal Reims
- Nigel G. Wilson. From Byzantium to Italy: Greek Studies in the Italian Renaissance. Baltimore: Johns Hopkins University Press, 1992.
