= Palazzo Flangini, Venice =

Palace in Italy

Coordinates: 45°26′24″N 12°19′48″E

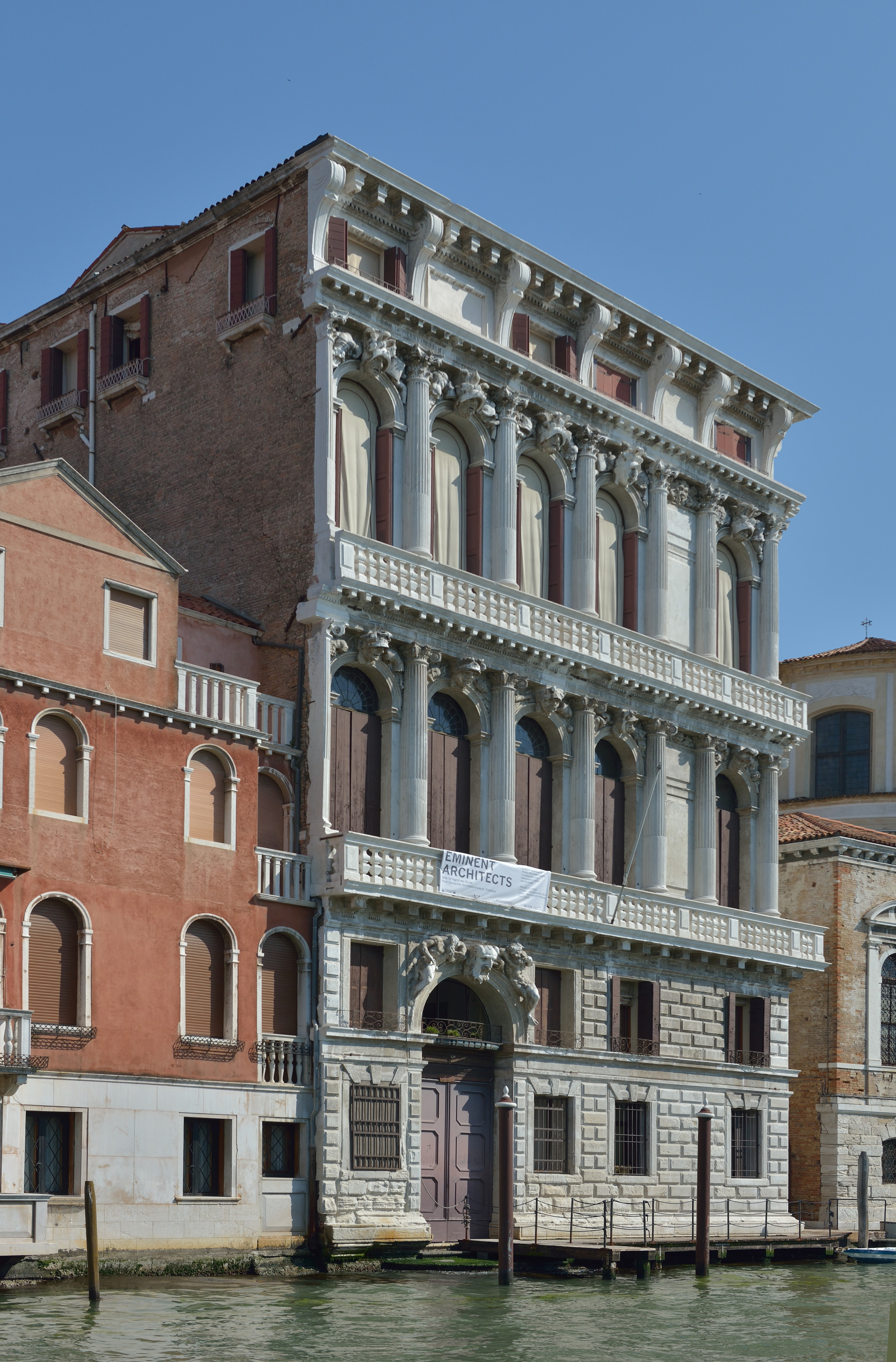
Facade of Palazzo Flangini

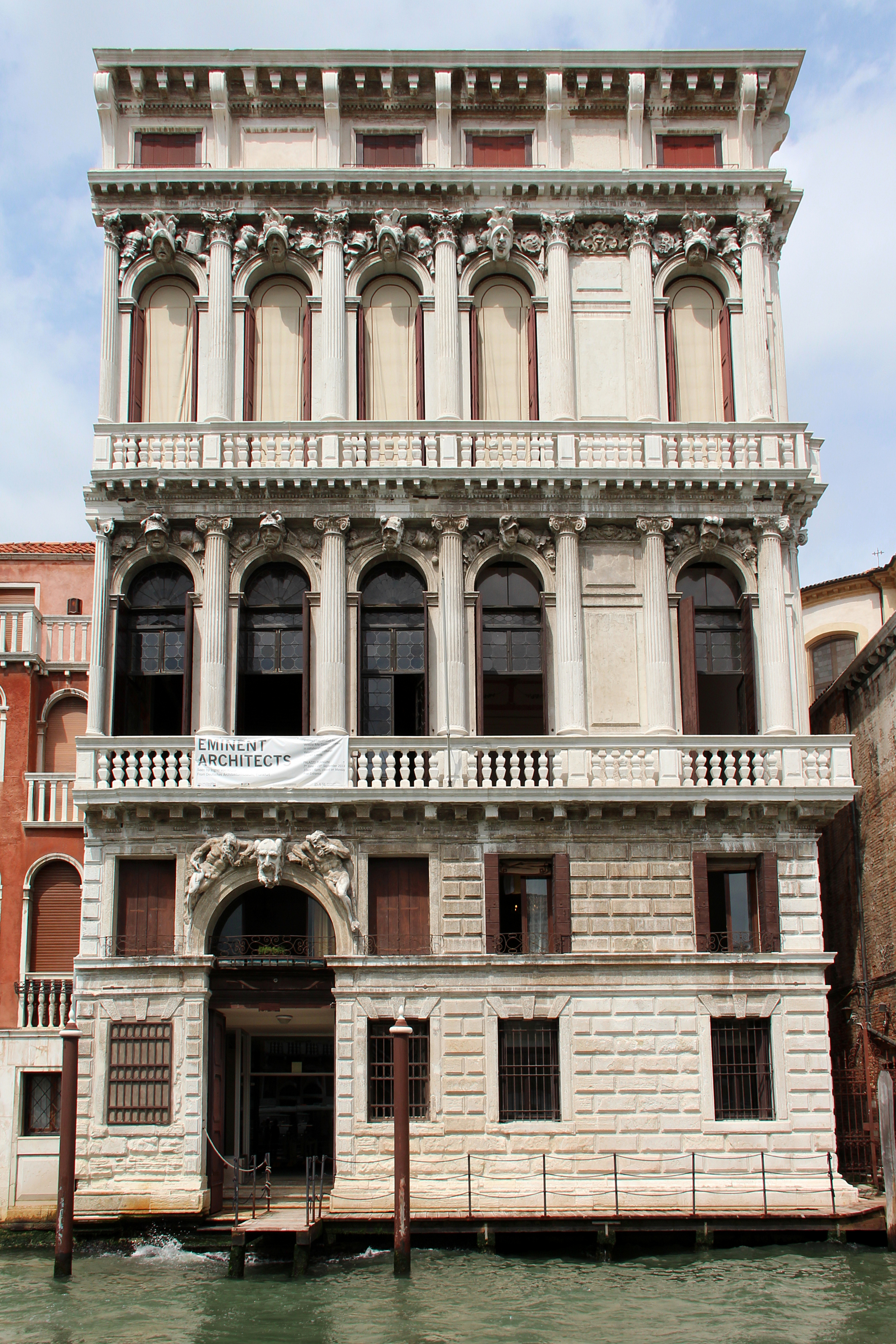
Facade of Palazzo Flangini

The Palazzo Flangini is a Baroque style palace on the Grand Canal, located adjacent to Campo San Geremia in the sestiere of Cannaregio in Venice, Italy.

== History ==
The palace was constructed in 1664–1682 to a design attributed to the architect Giuseppe Sardi. Others have incorrectly attributed the design to his mentor Baldassare Longhena. The palace was built by the Flangini family, a Greek Cypriot family in Venice. One of their members, Thomas Flanginis, in 1626 was the patron for the Flanginian school, a Greek school in Venice. The last of the family to own the palace was the cardinal Luigi or Ludovico Flangini (died 1804). By the end of the 18th century, the palace was occupied by the Panciera family. The palace is asymmetric; it is surmised that at some time the family was unable to purchase the adjacent property and that the original plans called for a palace of twice the size.
