= Totius =

Totius may refer to:

- Jakob Daniël du Toit (1877–1953), an Afrikaner poet, known as Totius
- Imperator totius Hispaniae, the title of Spanish monarchs
- Totius Graeciae Descriptio, a bestselling 16th century map of Greece drawn by Nikolaos Sophianos
- Optatam Totius, the Decree on Priestly Training, was a document produced by the Second Vatican Council
