= Byzantines =

People of the Byzantine Empire

Ῥωμαῖοι
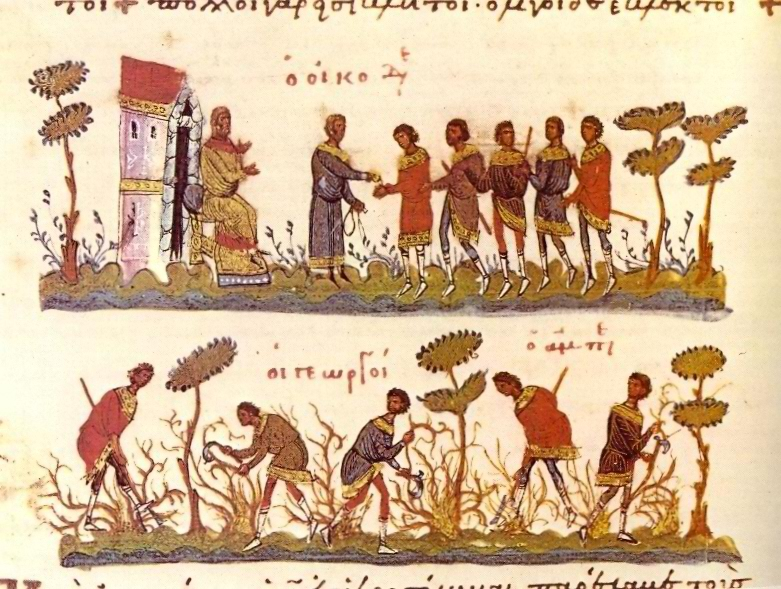
- Scenes of agricultural life in a Byzantine Gospel of the 11th century

Regions with significant populations
- Byzantine Empire (esp. Asia Minor, Balkans)

Languages
- Medieval Greek

Religion
- Eastern Orthodox Christianity

Related ethnic groups
- Roman people, Romioi, Greeks

The Byzantines or East Romans (Ancient Greek: Ῥωμαῖοι, romanized: Rōmaîoi) were the Byzantine Empire's main inhabitants. They understood their identity as Roman, within a predominantly Greek-speaking and Christian context. From the 6th century CE onward, they were increasingly associated in Western sources with a Greek identity and with what is now known as the Eastern Orthodox denomination. Following the decline of the empire and the fall of Constantinople, most Byzantines came under the rule of the Ottoman Empire, where those remaining Christians were organised within the Rum millet.

== Terminology ==
The adjective "Byzantine", derived from Byzantion (Byzantium in Latin), the name of the Greek settlement on which Constantinople was founded, originally referred only to the inhabitants of the city. Its usage began to broaden when Theodore Metochites and Laonikos Chalkokondyles employed "Byzantine" to denote the people of the empire as a whole; a development later widely propagated by Hieronymus Wolf. However, it was not until the mid-19th century that historians began systematically applying "Byzantines" to the empire's inhabitants, and the term is now regarded by many scholars as contentious. For most of the preceding millennium, the "Byzantines" were more commonly described as "Greeks".

During most of the Middle Ages, the Byzantines identified as "Romans". "Roman, Greek (if not used in its sense of 'pagan') and Christian became synonymous terms, counterposed to 'foreigner', 'barbarian', 'infidel'. The citizens of the Empire, now predominantly of Greek ethnicity and language, were often called simply the 'people who bear Christ's name'".

The Latin term Graikoí (from Γραικοί, "Greeks") was also used, which was rare in official Byzantine political correspondence prior to the Fourth Crusade of 1204. The name Hellenes was synonymous to "pagan" in popular use, but was revived as an ethnonym in the Middle Byzantine period (11th century).

While in the West the term "Roman" acquired a new meaning in connection with the Catholic Church and the Bishop of Rome, the Greek form "Romaioi" remained attached to the Greek-speakers of the Byzantine Empire. Despite the shift in terminology in the West, the Byzantines Empire's eastern neighbors, such as the Arabs, continued to refer to them as "Romans", as for instance in the 30th Surah of the Quran (Ar-Rum). The signifier "Roman" (Rum millet, "Roman nation") was also used by the Byzantines' later Ottoman rivals, and its Turkish equivalent Rûm, "Roman", continues to be used officially by the government of Turkey to denote the Greek Orthodox natives (Rumlar) of Istanbul, as well as the Ecumenical Patriarchate of Constantinople (Turkish: Rum Ortodoks Patrikhanesi, "Roman Orthodox Patriarchate"). The term Rum continued to be used as an exonym in various contexts.

Among Slavic populations of southeast Europe, such as Bulgarians and Serbs the name most commonly translated was "Greki" (Greeks). Some Slavonic texts during the early medieval era also used the terms Rimljani or Romei. At least one 11th-century Bulgarian source is attested which refers to "Ellini rimski" (Roman Hellenes). In most medieval Bulgarian sources the Byzantine Emperors were the "Tsars of the Greeks" and the Byzantine Empire was known as "Tsardom of the Greeks". Both rulers of the Despotate of Epirus and the Empire of Nicaea were also "Greek tsars ruling over Greek people".

Equally, among Nordic people such as Icelanders, Varangians (Vikings) and other Scandinavian people, they were called "Grikkr" (Greeks). There are various runic inscriptions left in Norway, Sweden and even in Athens by travellers and members of the Varangian Guard like Greece runestones and the Piraeus Lion which we meet the terms Grikkland (Greece) and Grikkr referring to their ventures in Byzantine Empire and their interaction with the Byzantines.

== History ==
The Byzantines are a Greek-speaking and Orthodox Christian people that historically inhabited the lands of the Byzantine Empire during Late Antiquity and the Middle Ages; (Note: Stouraitis 2017, pp. 70, 75; Shukurov 2011, pp. 180–181; Malatras 2011, pp. 421–422) They represented the dominant culture of the empire, which they called Rhomania (Ancient Greek: Ῥωμανία), primarily in the southern Balkans, Asia Minor, and other parts of the eastern Mediterranean. Throughout their history, they self-identified as Romans (Ancient Greek: Ῥωμαῖοι, Rhōmaîoi); medieval Europeans called them Greeks in their languages, while in the Islamic world they were known as Rum.

Use of Greek was already widespread in the eastern Roman Empire when Constantine I (r. 306–337) moved its capital to Constantinople, while Thrace and Anatolia (which now made up the core of the empire) had also been hellenized by early Byzantine times. The empire lost its predominantly non-Greek speaking provinces (Syria, Egypt, Africa) by the 7th century Muslim conquests and its population was overwhelmingly Greek-speaking by the 8th century. Unlike the early medieval West, the Greek education of the East was more advanced, resulting in widespread basic literacy. Success came easily to Greek-speaking merchants, who enjoyed a strong position in international trade.

After the fall of the empire, the Ottomans used the term "Rum millet" ("Roman nation") for their Greek and Eastern Orthodox populations. It increasingly transformed into an ethnic identity, marked by Greek language and Orthodoxy, shaping modern Greek identity. Although the term 'Hellen' was briefly revived by the Nicaenean elite and in intellectual circles by Gemistos Plethon and John Argyropoulos, the Roman self-identification persisted until the Greek Revolution, when 'Hellen' came to replace it. Greeks still sometimes use "Romioi" ("Romans") in addition to "Hellenes", and "Romaic" ("Roman") for the Modern Greek language.

== Culture ==
=== Language ===
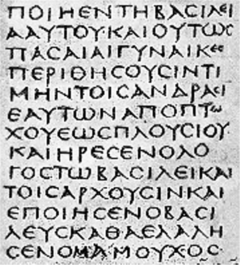
Uncial script, from a 4th-century Septuagint manuscript.

Linguistic map of the Late Roman Empire c. 400

The Eastern Roman Empire was in language and civilization a Greek society. Linguistically, Byzantine or medieval Greek is situated between the Hellenistic (Koine) and modern phases of the language. After the conquests of Alexander the Great, during the Hellenistic era, Koine Greek had been the lingua franca of the educated elites of the Eastern Mediterranean, spoken natively in the southern Balkans, the Greek islands, Asia Minor, Thrace and the ancient and Hellenistic Greek colonies of Southern Italy, the Black Sea, Western Asia and North Africa. At the beginning of the Byzantine millennium, the koine (Greek: κοινή) remained the basis for spoken Greek and Christian writings, while Attic Greek was the language of the philosophers and orators.

As Christianity became the dominant religion, Attic began to be used in Christian writings in addition to and often interspersed with koine Greek. Nonetheless, from the 6th at least until the 12th century, Attic remained entrenched in the educational system; while further changes to the spoken language can be postulated for the early and middle Byzantine periods.

The population of the Byzantine Empire, at least in its early stages, had a variety of mother tongues including Greek. These included Latin, Aramaic, Coptic, and Caucasian languages, while Cyril Mango also cites evidence for bilingualism in the south and southeast. These influences, as well as an influx of people of Arabic, Celtic, Germanic, Turkic, and Slavic backgrounds, supplied medieval Greek with many loanwords that have survived in the modern Greek language. From the 11th century onward, there was also a steady rise in the literary use of the vernacular.

Following the Fourth Crusade, there was increased contact with the West; and the lingua franca of commerce became Italian. In the areas of the Crusader kingdoms a classical education (Greek: παιδεία, paideia) ceased to be a sine qua non of social status, leading to the rise of the vernacular. From this era many beautiful works in the vernacular, often written by people deeply steeped in classical education, are attested. A famous example is the four Ptochoprodromic poems attributed to Theodoros Prodromos. From the 13th to the 15th centuries, the last centuries of the Empire, there arose several works, including laments, fables, romances, and chronicles, written outside Constantinople, which until then had been the seat of most literature, in an idiom termed by scholars as "Byzantine Koine".

However, the diglossia of the Greek-speaking world, which had already started in ancient Greece, continued under Ottoman rule and persisted in the modern Greek state until 1976, although Koine Greek remains the official language of the Greek Orthodox Church. As shown in the poems of Ptochoprodromos, an early stage of modern Greek had already been shaped by the 12th century and possibly earlier. Vernacular Greek continued to be known as "Romaic" ("Roman") until the 20th century.

=== Religion ===
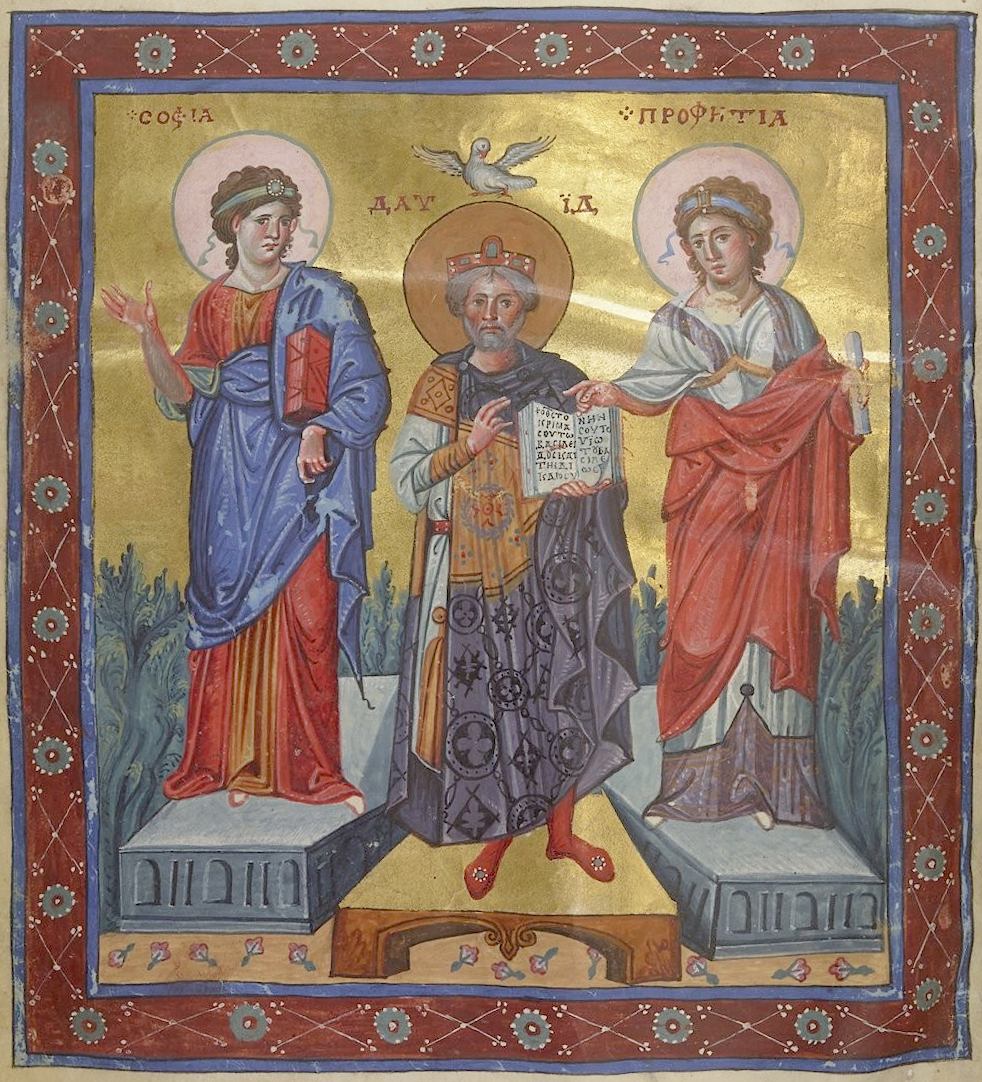
King David in the imperial purple (Paris Psalter).

At the time of Constantine the Great (r. 306–337), barely 10% of the Roman Empire's population were Christians, with most of them being urban population and generally found in the eastern part of the Roman Empire. The majority of people still honoured the old gods in the public Roman way of religio. As Christianity became a complete philosophical system, whose theory and apologetics were heavily indebted to the Classic word, this changed. In addition, Constantine, as Pontifex Maximus, was responsible for the correct cultus or veneratio of the deity which was in accordance with former Roman practice. The move from the old religion to the new entailed some elements of continuity as well as break with the past, though the artistic heritage of paganism was literally broken by Christian zeal.

Christianity led to the development of a few phenomena characteristic of Byzantium. Namely, the intimate connection between Church and State, a legacy of Roman cultus. Also, the creation of a Christian philosophy that guided Byzantines in their everyday lives. And finally, the dichotomy between the Christian ideals of the Bible and classical Greek paideia which could not be left out, however, since so much of Christian scholarship and philosophy depended on it. These shaped Byzantine Greek character and the perceptions of themselves and others.

Christians at the time of Constantine's conversion made up only 10% of the population. This would rise to 50% by the end of the fourth century and 90% by the end of the fifth century. Emperor Justinian I (r. 527–565) then brutally mopped up the rest of the pagans, highly literate academics on one end of the scale and illiterate peasants on the other. A conversion so rapid seems to have been rather the result of expediency than of conviction.

The survival of the Empire in the East assured an active role of the emperor in the affairs of the Church. The Byzantine state inherited from pagan times the administrative and financial routine of organising religious affairs, and this routine was applied to the Christian Church. Following the pattern set by Eusebius of Caesarea, the Byzantines viewed the emperor as a representative or messenger of Christ, responsible particularly for the propagation of Christianity among pagans, and for the "externals" of the religion, such as administration and finances. The imperial role in the affairs of the Church never developed into a fixed, legally defined system, however.

With the decline of Rome, and internal dissension in the other Eastern patriarchates, the church of Constantinople became, between the 6th and 11th centuries, the richest and most influential centre of Christendom. Even when the Byzantine Empire was reduced to only a shadow of its former self, the Church, as an institution, exercised so much influence both inside and outside the imperial frontiers as never before. As George Ostrogorsky points out:

"The Patriarchate of Constantinople remained the center of the Orthodox world, with subordinate metropolitan sees and archbishoprics in the territory of Asia Minor and the Balkans, now lost to Byzantium, as well as in Caucasus, Russia and Lithuania. The Church remained the most stable element in the Byzantine Empire."

In terms of religion, Byzantine Greek Macedonia is also significant as being the home of Saints Cyril and Methodius, two Greek brothers from Thessaloniki (Salonika) who were sent on state-sponsored missions to proselytize among the Slavs of the Balkans and east-central Europe. This involved Cyril and Methodius having to translate the Christian Bible into the Slavs' own language, for which they invented an alphabet that became known as Old Church Slavonic. In the process, this cemented the Greek brothers' status as the pioneers of Slavic literature and those who first introduced Byzantine civilization and Orthodox Christianity to the hitherto illiterate and pagan Slavs.

== Identity ==
=== Self-perception ===
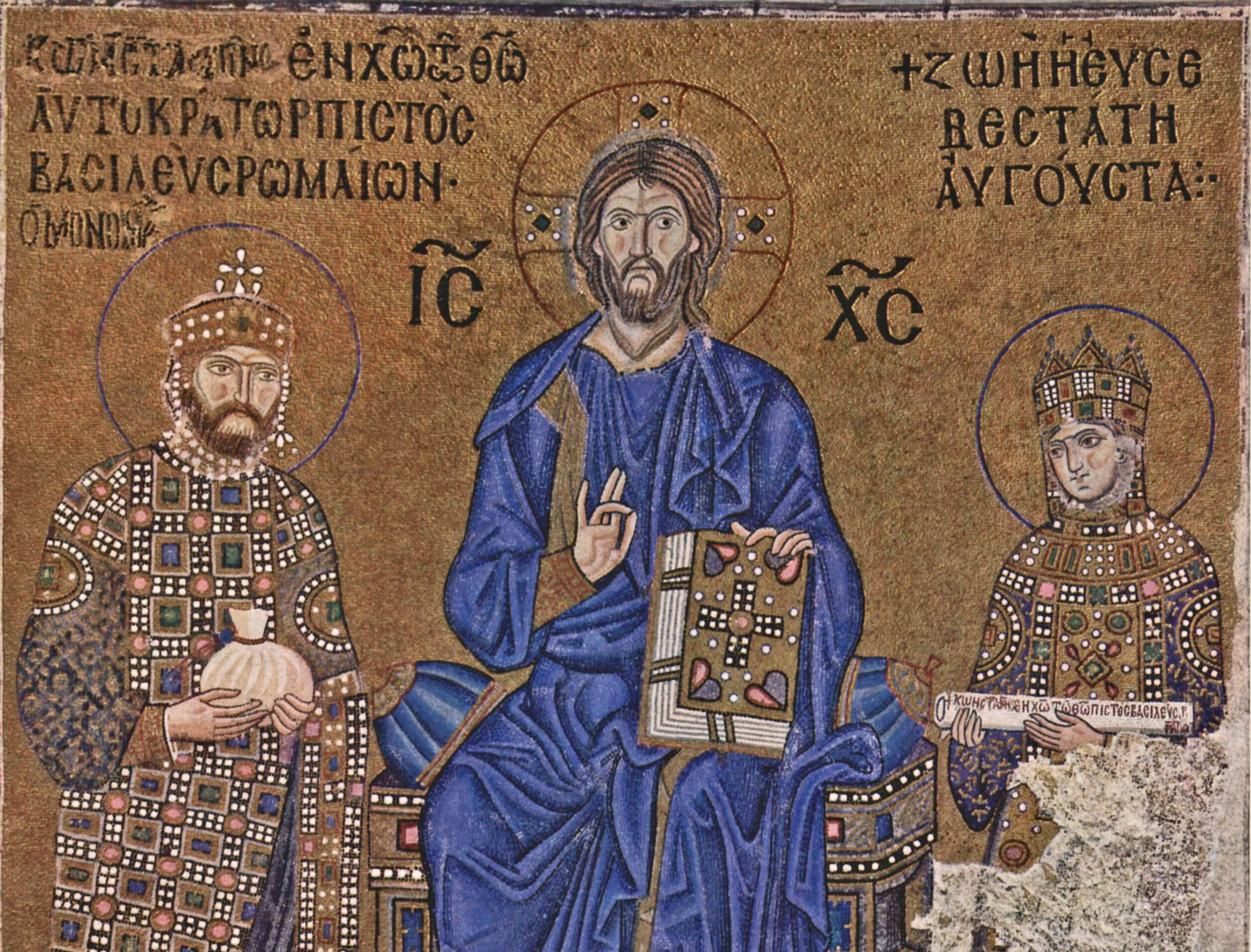
11th century Hagia Sophia mosaic. On the left, Constantine IX "faithful in Christ the God, Emperor of the Romans".

According to Stouraitis (2014), there have been three main approaches regarding the medieval Eastern Roman identity in Byzantine scholarship.

- First, a school of thought that developed largely under the influence of modern Greek nationalism, treats Eastern Roman identity as the medieval form of a perennial Greek national identity.
- Second, the view which could be regarded as preponderant in the field considers a multi-ethnic empire at least up to the 12th century, where the average subject identified as Roman.
- Third, a line of thought views the empire as a pre-modern nation-state, where the eastern Roman identity had traits of pre-modern national identity.

Throughout their history, the Byzantines identified as Romans (Romaioi). The defining traits of being considered one of the Rhomaioi were being an Eastern Orthodox Christian and more importantly speaking Greek, characteristics which had to be acquired by birth if one was not to be considered an allogenes or even a barbarian. The term mostly used to describe someone who was a foreigner to both the Byzantines and their state was ethnikós (Greek: ἐθνικός), a term which originally described non-Jews or non-Christians, but had lost its religious meaning. In a classicizing vein usually applied to other peoples, Byzantine authors regularly referred to their people as "Ausones", an ancient name for the original inhabitants of Italy. Most historians agree that the defining features of their civilization were: 1) Greek language, culture, literature, and science, 2) Roman law and tradition, 3) Christian faith. The Byzantines were, and perceived themselves as, heirs to the culture of ancient Greece, the political heirs of imperial Rome, and followers of the Apostles. Thus, their sense of "Romanity" was different from that of their contemporaries in the West. "Romaic" was the name of the vulgar Greek language, as opposed to "Hellenic" which was its literary or doctrinal form. Being a Roman was mostly a matter of culture and religion rather than speaking Greek or living within Byzantine territory, and had nothing to do with race. Some Byzantines began to use the name Hellen (Greek) with its ancient meaning of someone living in the territory of Greece rather than its usually Christian meaning of 'pagan'. Realizing that the restored empire held lands of ancient Greeks and had a population largely descended from them, some scholars such as George Gemistos Plethon and John Argyropoulos emphasized a pagan Greek and Christian Roman past, mostly during a time of Byzantine political decline. However, such views were part of a few learned people, and the majority of Byzantine Christians would see them as nonsensical or dangerous. After 1204, the Byzantine successor entities were mostly Greek-speaking, but not nation-states like France and England of that time. The risk or reality of foreign rule, not some sort of Greek national consciousness, was the primary element that drew contemporary Byzantines together. Byzantine elites and common people nurtured a high self-esteem based on their perceived cultural superiority towards foreigners, whom they viewed with contempt; despite the frequent occurrence of compliments to an individual foreigner as an andreîos Rhōmaióphrōn (ἀνδρεῖος Ῥωμαιόφρων, roughly 'a brave Roman-minded fellow'). There was always an element of indifference to, or neglect of, everything non-Greek, which was therefore "barbarian".

=== Official discourse ===
In official discourse, "all inhabitants of the empire were subjects of the emperor, and therefore Romans." Thus the primary definition of Rhōmaios was "political or statist." In order to succeed in being a full-blown and unquestioned "Roman" it was best to be a Greek Orthodox Christian and a Greek-speaker, at least in one's public persona. Yet, the cultural uniformity which the Byzantine church and the state pursued through Orthodoxy and the Greek language was not sufficient to erase distinct identities, nor did it aim to.

=== Regional identity ===
Often one's local (geographic) identity could outweigh one's identity as a Rhōmaios. The terms xénos (Greek: ξένος) and exōtikós (Greek: ἐξωτικός) denoted "people foreign to the local population," regardless of whether they were from abroad or from elsewhere within the Byzantine Empire. "When a person was away from home he was a stranger and was often treated with suspicion. A monk from western Asia Minor who joined a monastery in Pontus was 'disparaged and mistreated by everyone as a stranger'. The corollary to regional solidarity was regional hostility."

Provincial identities, referred to as ethnē (έθνη) or genē (γένη), were fully imbricated in the imperial system, as the Roman habit of referring to the population with their provincial labels (εθνικά, ethnika) persisted in the Byzantine society. In the middle Byzantine period, new administrative districts, known as themata, were superimposed on the ancient provinces, giving rise to new or reviving old provincial labels; such as the "genos of Opsikion" and "Anatolikon" respectively. Scholarship typically views these labels to have functioned as Byzantine "ethnicities", or according to Anthony Kaldellis, as "pseudo-ethnicities", as those groups were not distinguished in culture or their shared Eastern Roman identity.

=== Revival of Hellenism ===
From an evolutionary standpoint, Byzantium was the multi-ethnic Roman state that conquered the Greek East, turned into a Christian empire, and ended in 1453, as a Greek Orthodox state; it had become a nation, almost by the modern meaning of the word. The presence of a distinctive and historically rich literary culture was also very important in the division between "Greek" East and "Latin" West, and thus the formation of both. It was a multi-ethnic empire where the Hellenic element was predominant, especially in the later period.

Spoken language and state, the markers of identity that were to become a fundamental tenet of nineteenth-century nationalism throughout Europe became, by accident, a reality during a formative period of medieval Greek history. After the Empire lost non-Greek speaking territories in the 7th and 8th centuries, "Greek" (Ἕλλην), when not used to signify "pagan", became synonymous with "Roman" (Ῥωμαῖος) and "Christian" (Χριστιανός) to mean a Christian Greek citizen of the Eastern Roman Empire.

In the context of increasing Venetian and Genoese power in the eastern Mediterranean, association with Hellenism took deeper root among the Byzantine elite, on account of a desire to distinguish themselves from the Latin West and to lay legitimate claims to Greek-speaking lands. From the 12th century onwards, Byzantine Roman writers started to disassociate themselves from the Empire's pre-Constantinian Latin past, regarding henceforth the transfer of the Roman capital to Constantinople by Constantine as their founding moment and reappraised the normative value of the pagan Hellenes, even though the latter were still viewed as a group distinct from the Byzantines. The first time the term "Hellene" was used to mean "Byzantine" in official correspondence was in a letter to Emperor Manuel I Komnenus (1118–1180). Beginning in the twelfth century and especially after 1204, certain Byzantine Greek intellectuals began to use the ancient Greek ethnonym Héllēn (Greek: Ἕλλην) in order to describe Byzantine civilisation. After the fall of Constantinople to the Crusaders in 1204, a small circle of the elite of the Empire of Nicaea used the term Hellene as a term of self-identification. For example, in a letter to Pope Gregory IX, the Nicaean emperor John III Doukas Vatatzes (r. 1221–1254) claimed to have received the gift of royalty from Constantine the Great, and put emphasis on his "Hellenic" descent, exalting the wisdom of the Greek people. He was presenting Hellenic culture as an integral part of the Byzantine polity in defiance of Latin claims. Emperor Theodore II Laskaris (r. 1254–1258), the only one during this period to systematically employ the term Hellene as a term of self-identification, tried to revive Hellenic tradition by fostering the study of philosophy, for in his opinion there was a danger that philosophy "might abandon the Greeks and seek refuge among the Latins". For historians of the court of Nikaia, however, such as George Akropolites and George Pachymeres, Rhomaios remained the only significant term of self-identification, despite traces of influence of the policy of the Emperors of Nikaia in their writings.

During the Palaiologan dynasty, after the Byzantines recaptured Constantinople, Rhomaioi became again dominant as a term for self-description and there are few traces of Hellene, such as in the writings of George Gemistos Plethon; the neo-platonic philosopher boasted "We are Hellenes by race and culture," and proposed a reborn Byzantine Empire following a utopian Hellenic system of government centered in Mystras. Under the influence of Plethon, John Argyropoulos, addressed Emperor John VIII Palaiologos (r. 1425–1448) as "Sun King of Hellas" and urged the last Byzantine emperor, Constantine XI Palaiologos (r. 1449–1453), to proclaim himself "King of the Hellenes". These largely rhetorical expressions of Hellenic identity were confined in a very small circle and had no impact on the people. They were however continued by Byzantine intellectuals who participated in the Italian Renaissance.

=== Western perception ===
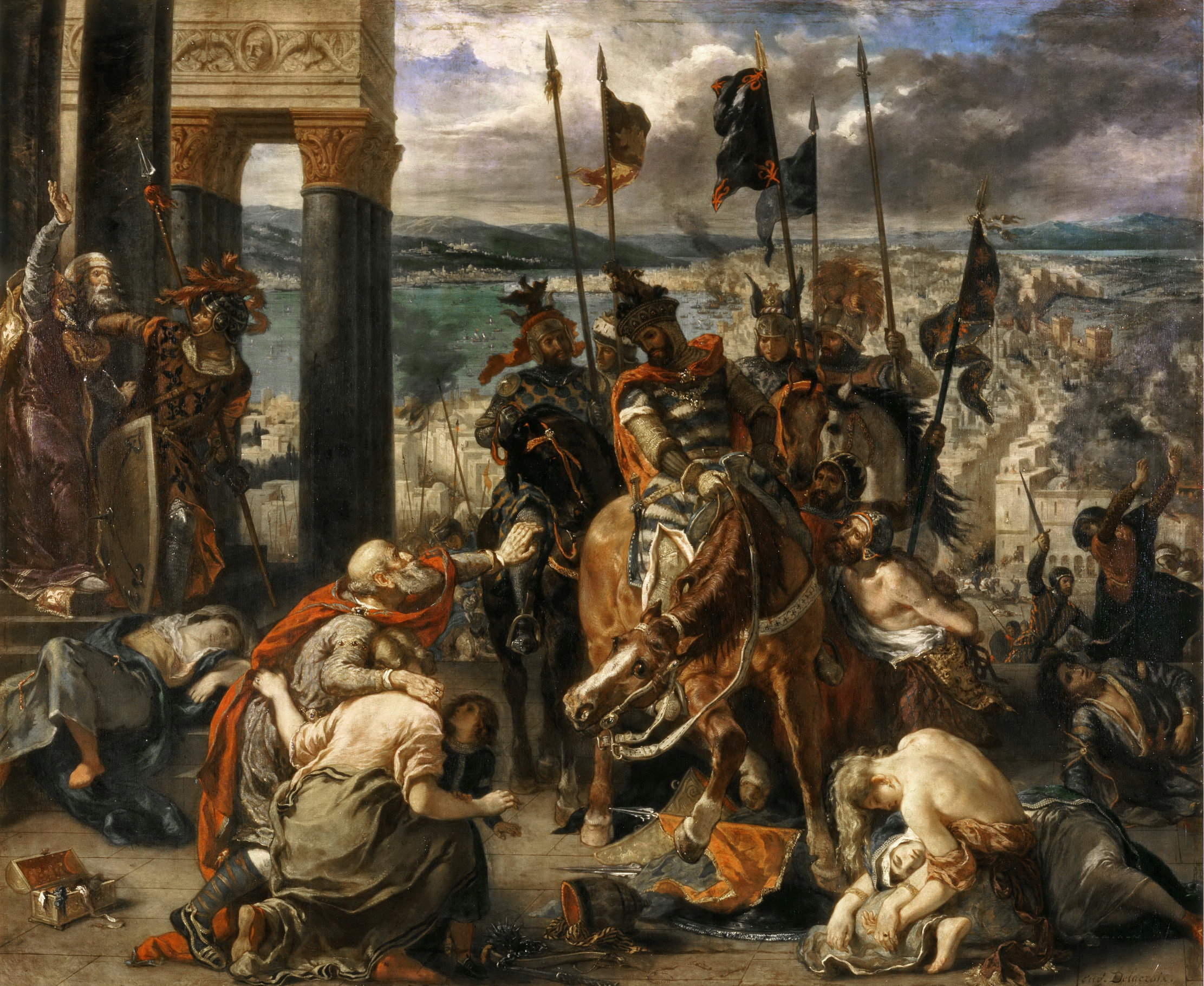
The Entry of the Crusaders into Constantinople, by Eugène Delacroix, 1840.

In the eyes of the West, after the coronation of Charlemagne, the Byzantines were not acknowledged as the inheritors of the Roman Empire. Byzantium was rather perceived to be a corrupted continuation of ancient Greece, and was often derided as the "Empire of the Greeks" or "Kingdom of Greece". Such denials of Byzantium's Roman heritage and ecumenical rights would instigate the first resentments between Greeks and "Latins" (for the Latin liturgical rite) or "Franks" (for Charlemegne's ethnicity), as they were called by the Greeks.

Popular Western opinion is reflected in the Translatio militiae, whose anonymous Latin author states that the Greeks had lost their courage and their learning, and therefore did not join in the war against the infidels. In another passage, the ancient Greeks are praised for their military skill and their learning, by which means the author draws a contrast with contemporary Byzantines, who were generally viewed as a non-warlike and schismatic people. While this reputation seems strange to modern eyes given the unceasing military operations of the Byzantines and their eight century struggle against Islam and Islamic states, it reflects the realpolitik sophistication of the Byzantines, who employed diplomacy and trade as well as armed force in foreign policy, and the high-level of their culture in contrast to the zeal of the Crusaders and the ignorance and superstition of the medieval West. As historian Steven Runciman has put it:

"Ever since our rough crusading forefathers first saw Constantinople and met, to their contemptuous disgust, a society where everyone read and wrote, ate food with forks and preferred diplomacy to war, it has been fashionable to pass the Byzantines by with scorn and to use their name as synonymous with decadence".

A turning point in how both sides viewed each other is probably the massacre of Latins in Constantinople in 1182. The massacre followed the deposition of Maria of Antioch, a Norman-Frankish (therefore "Latin") princess who was ruling as regent to her infant son Emperor Alexios II Komnenos. Maria was deeply unpopular due to the heavy-handed favoritism that had been shown the Italian merchants during the regency and popular celebrations of her downfall by the citizenry of Constantinople quickly turned to rioting and massacre. The event and the horrific reports of survivors inflamed religious tensions in the West, leading to the retaliatory sacking of Thessalonica, the empire's second largest city, by William II of Sicily. An example of Western opinion at the time is the writings of William of Tyre, who described the "Greek nation" as "a brood of vipers, like a serpent in the bosom or a mouse in the wardrobe evilly requite their guests".

=== Eastern perception ===
In the East, the Persians and Arabs continued to regard these people as "Romans" (Arabic: ar-Rūm) after the fall of the Western Roman Empire, for instance, the 30th surah of the Quran (Ar-Rum) refers to the defeat of the Byzantines ("Rum" or "Romans") under Heraclius by the Persians at the Battle of Antioch (613), and promises an eventual Byzantine ("Roman") victory. This traditional designation of the Byzantines as [Eastern] Romans in the Muslim world continued through the Middle Ages, leading to names such as the Sultanate of Rum ("Sultanate over the Romans") in conquered Anatolia and personal names such as Rumi, the mystical Persian poet who lived in formerly Byzantine Konya in the 1200s. Late medieval Arab geographers still saw the Byzantines as Rum (Romans) not as Greeks, for instance Ibn Battuta saw the, then collapsing, Rum as "pale continuators and successors of the ancient Greeks (Yunani) in matters of culture."

The Muslim Ottomans also referred to the as Rum millet and Rûm, "Romans", and that term is still in official use in Turkey for the Greek-speaking natives (Rumlar) of Istanbul cf. Ecumenical Patriarchate of Constantinople (Turkish: Rum Ortodoks Patrikhanesi, "Roman Orthodox Patriarchate"). Many place-names in Anatolia derive from this Turkish word (Rûm, "Romans") for the Byzantines: Erzurum ("Arzan of the Romans"), Rumelia ("Land of the Romans"), and Rumiye-i Suğra ("Little Rome", the region of Amasya and Sivas).

== Post-Byzantine history ==
=== Greek scholars in the Renaissance ===
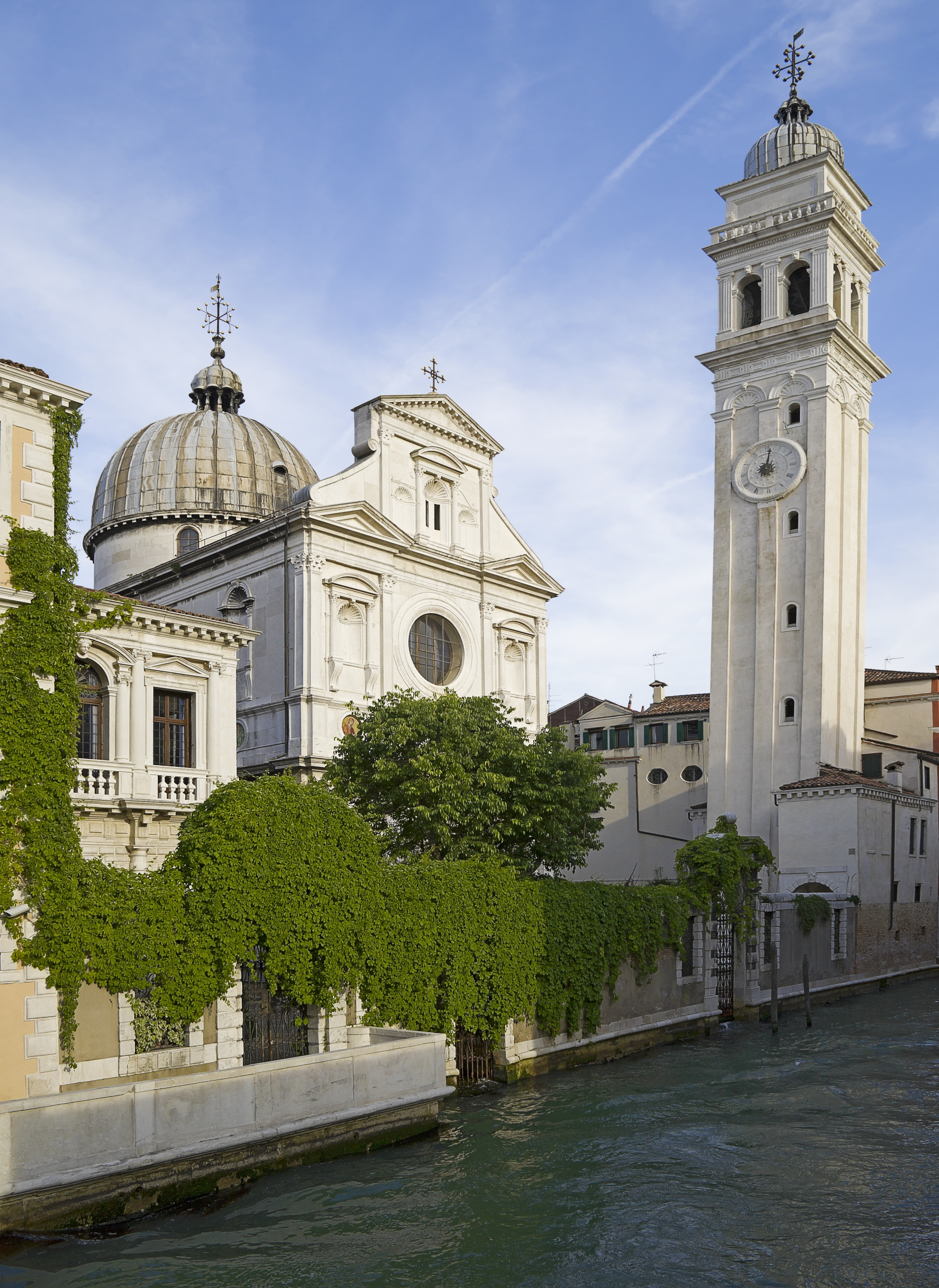
The Scuola dei Greci was the cultural and religious center of the Greek community in Venice.

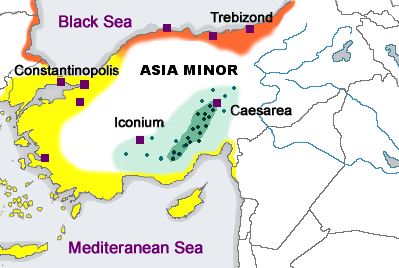
Distribution of dialects descended from Byzantine Greek in 1923. Demotic in yellow. Pontic in orange. Cappadocian in green, with green dots indicating individual Cappadocian Greek speaking villages in 1910.

Forming the majority of the Byzantine Empire proper at the height of its power, the Byzantines gradually came under the dominance of foreign powers with the decline of the Empire during the Middle Ages. The majority of Byzantines lived in the Ionian islands, the southern Balkans, and Aegean islands, Crete, Cyprus and Asia Minor. Following the end of the Byzantine Empire in 1453, there were many migration waves of Byzantine Greek scholars and emigres to the west, which is considered by many scholars key to the revival of Greek studies that led to the development of the Renaissance humanism and science. These emigres brought to Western Europe the relatively well-preserved remnants and accumulated knowledge of their own (Greek) civilization, which had mostly not survived the Early Middle Ages in the West. By 1500, the Greek community of Venice numbered about 5,000 members. The community was very active in Venice with the notable members such as Anna Notaras (the daughter of Loukas Notaras, the last megas doux of the Byzantine Empire), Thomas Flanginis (the founder of the Flanginian School) and many others. Additionally, the community founded the confraternity Scuola dei Greci in 1493. The Venetians also ruled Crete, the Ionian Islands and scattered islands and port cities of the former empire, the populations of which were augmented by refugees from other Byzantine provinces who preferred Venetian to Ottoman governance. Crete was especially notable for the Cretan School of icon-painting, where El Greco came from and which after 1453 became the most important in the Greek world.

=== Rum millet and Romioi in the Ottoman Empire ===
Nearly all of these Byzantines fell under Ottoman rule by the 16th century, and were known as the Rum millet in the Ottoman empire. A notable group were the Phanariots, they emerged as a class of wealthy Greek merchants (of mostly noble Byzantine descent) during the second half of the 16th century, and were influential in the administration of the Ottoman Empire's Balkan domains and the Danubian Principalities in the 18th century. The Phanariots usually built their houses in the Phanar quarter to be near the court of the Patriarch.

Many retained their identities, eventually comprising the modern Greek and Cypriot states, as well as the Asia Minor Greeks, like the Cappadocian Greek and Pontic Greek minorities of the new Turkish state. These latter groups, the legacy Byzantine groups of Anatolia, were forced to emigrate from Turkey to Greece in 1923 by the Population exchange between Greece and Turkey. Other Byzantines, particularly in Anatolia, converted to Islam and underwent Turkification over time. Additionally, those who came under Arab Muslim rule, either fled their former lands or submitted to the new Muslim rulers, receiving the status of Dhimmi. Over the centuries these surviving Christian societies of former Byzantines in Arab realms evolved into Antiochian Greeks (Melkites) or merged into the societies of Arab Christians, existing to this day.

Many Greek Orthodox populations, particularly those outside the newly independent modern Greek state, continued to refer to themselves as Romioi (i.e. Romans, Byzantines) well into the 20th century. Peter Charanis, who was born on the island of Lemnos in 1908 and later became a professor of Byzantine history at Rutgers University, recounts that when the island was taken from the Ottomans by Greece in 1912, Greek soldiers were sent to each village and stationed themselves in the public squares. Some of the island children ran to see what Greek soldiers looked like. "What are you looking at?" one of the soldiers asked. "At Hellenes," the children replied. "Are you not Hellenes yourselves?" the soldier retorted. "No, we are Romans," the children replied. The Roman identity also survives prominently in some Greek populations outside of Greece itself. For instance, Greeks in Ukraine, settled there as part of Catherine the Great's Greek Plan in the 18th century, maintain Roman identity, designating themselves as Rumaioi.

== See also ==
- Byzantine (disambiguation)
- Macedonian dynasty
- Komnenos
- Greek fire
- Byzantine literature
- Byzantine aristocracy
- Byzantine commonwealth
