= Francisco Leontaritis =

Greek composer, singer, and hymnographer

Francisco Leontaritis or Francesco Londarit or Francesco Londarit, Franciscus Londariti, Leondaryti, Londaretus, Londaratus or Londaritus (1518-1572) was a Greek composer, singer and hymnographer from today's Heraklion of the Venetian-ruled Crete (i.e. Kingdom of Candia) during the Renaissance. He is considered by many as the father of modern Greek classical music.

== Life ==
Leontaritis was born in 1518 in Crete, son of the Greek catholic priest Nikolaos Leondaritis and his mistress Maria Siminopoula. After solving the problems of legitimacy, Nikolaos promoted Francisco to priesthood. In 1535 he is found as priest in the catholic church of Saint Tito (Hagios Titos) of Candia. Between 1537 and 1544 he was the organ player in the same church. It is not known how he studied music. In 1544 he appears to be a composer. He was an established musician and moved from Crete to Italy to study Renaissance polyphonic music. In 1549, because of his good voice, he became member of the famous choir of St. Mark in Venice under the direction of Adrian Willaert.

He was a student of some of the greatest musicians of his time, such as Orlande de Lassus and Giovanni Pierluigi da Palestrina. He established a reputation very quickly in Venice as a capable composer and singer (cantore). He was thus invited to sing in churches in Rome and Padua, and was summoned to perform often at houses of nobles such as Antonio Zantani. His acquaintance with Nikolaus Stopius and German banker Jakob Fugger led him to Bavaria in Munich. He also worked as a composer in Augsburg and Salzburg. In 1568 he returned to Crete, possibly to avoid his debts. He worked as an organ player and teacher of music in St. Titus. His year of death is unknown, but records of him end in 1572.

== Work ==
He was established in music dictionaries as "il Greco" (The Greek). He composed three masses and twenty one motets, madrigals and napolitans. From his work only the madrigal Ditene o Dei and the three masses (Missa super Aller mi faut, Missa super Je prens en grez and Missa super Letatus sum) have survived until today.

== See also ==
- Greek scholars in the Renaissance

== Sources ==
- N.M. Panayiotakis Franghiskos Leontaritis: Cretan composer of the 16th century. Accounts of his life and work, Library of the Hellenic Institute of Byzantine and Post-Byzantine Studies, No. 12, Venice (1990). Summary of this work is in Adamidis, Ioannis (2017) "The ecclesiastical organs in Greece" (Αδαμίδης Ιωάννης, "Τα εκκλησιαστικά όργανα στην Ελλάδα", PhD Thesis, Ionian University, Greece, p. 31, footnote 142. In Greek
