= Ioannis Chalkeus =

Aromanian scholar and philosopher

Ioannis Chalkeus or Chalkias (Aromanian: Joan Chalkeus; Greek: Ιωάννης Χαλκεύς; Romanian: Ioan Halchia or Halcheu; 1667–between 1730 and 1740), was an Aromanian scholar, philosopher and figure of the modern Greek Enlightenment.

He was born in Moscopole, a major 18th century intellectual and commercial center of the Balkans (now in modern southeast Albania). Chalkeus initially studied in the Greek college of his native town and then went to Rome where he converted to Catholicism. Chalkeus became director and teacher of the Greek school in Venice, the Flanginian, from 1694 to 1703 and from 1712 to 1716. He probably returned to Moscopole where he continued to teach.

Among his students was also Theodore Kavalliotis, also a figure of the modern Greek Enlightenment, to whom Chalkeus taught Aristotelian philosophy and thought.
