= Nikolaos Sophianos =

Greek Renaissance humanist and cartographer

Nikolaos Sophianos (Greek: Νικόλαος Σοφιανός; c. 1500 – after 1551) was a Greek Renaissance humanist and cartographer chiefly noted for his Totius Graeciae Descriptio map and his grammar of Greek. He was born into the local nobility of Corfu at the beginning of the 16th century. He was educated at the Greek Quirinal College in Rome, co-founded by another Greek scholar, Janus Lascaris, who also became his teacher along with Arsenius Apostolius. Sophianos did not return to live in Greece, only briefly visiting in 1543. He spent the rest of his life in Rome, where he became a librarian, and in Venice, where he worked as a copyist. His cartographical work was published in 1540. He also built the first Notary on the island of Ithaca. He was also from a Noble family of Sofianos that came from Monemvasia. He helped to build the Greek orthodox church in Venice.

== Known works ==
- He Grammatike tes Koines Ton Hellenon Glosses-a Greek grammar
- Totius Graeciae Descriptio-a historical map of Greece

== See also ==
- Greek scholars in the Renaissance
