= Andronicus Contoblacas =

Andronicus Contoblacas (Greek: Ἀνδρόνικος Κοντοβλάκας) was a Greek Renaissance humanist and scholar. Contobacles originated from Constantinople and left after the Ottoman Empire conquered the city. He first travelled to Venice, Italy. From 1458 and 1465 an Andronikos from Constantinople is mentioned as a lecturer in humanist studies at the University of Bologna. A professor for the Greek Language is mentioned for the term 1466/67 at the same university. Coming from Northern Italy, he arrived in Basel where he resided for about three years between 1474 and 1477. He taught Greek to students of the University of Basel, staying at the dorm of Hieronymus Berlin. He is noted for having been a teacher to Johann Reuchlin. The last notion from Contobacles is a letter to Reuchlin, in which he encourages him to become a teacher for Greek language himself.

== See also ==
- Greek scholars in the Renaissance
