= Maximos Margunios =

Maximos Margunios (b.1549 Candia, Crete - d. 1602, Venice) Bishop of Cerigo (Kythira), was a Greek Renaissance humanist. He was a teacher at the Greek school in Venice and noted Patriarch Cyril Lucaris was among his students, Margunios was a supporter of ecclesiastical Union with Rome and wrote on the theology of the procession of the Holy Spirit. Margunios was also noted for his charitable and moderate views on the Latin Church.

He is also known for writing poetry and publishing some first editions of Greek and Byzantine texts in the Latin language, such as works of John Chrysostom. He also corresponded with a large number of humanists in Western European countries like England, France and Italy; especially those based in Tübingen, Germany, e.g. Martin Crusius.

== Known works ==
- Three Books Concerning the Procession of the Holy Ghost
- Arguments against the Latins
- Dialogue between a Greek and a Latin

== See also ==
- Greek scholars in the Renaissance
