= Antonios Eparchos =

Antonios Eparchos (Greek: Αντώνιος Έπαρχος; 1491–1571) was a Greek Renaissance humanist, teacher, poet, copyist, collector, soldier and translator of manuscripts.

He was born in Corfu and migrated to Venice in 1537. Later, he was placed in charge of the Greek college of Milan.

== Biography ==
Eparchos was the descendant of a noble Corfiot family and he was born in Corfu in 1491. His father was the scholar and doctor George Eparchos while his mother was from Sparta, Laconia. The collection of ancient codices and the studies in medical schools was a tradition in his family.

At the age of 15 he copied his first manuscripts, the Gospels. In 1536 Eparchos was elected as the Ambassador of the Community of Corfu, and represented the island before the Venetian Senate. It is also known that he took part in the Corfiot embassy that arrived from Corfu, which took the role of conveying the requests of its inhabitants to the Venetian Doge, in 1552 and 1570, one year before his death. A milestone in Eparchos's life was 1537: the Great Siege of Corfu by the Ottomans under Hayreddin Barbarossa, during the reign of Suleiman the Magnificent. During the siege, savage slaughter, extensive looting and destruction of the island took place. Eparchos was also made Baron of the Fief of the Gypsies, in the island of Corfu, which brought him considerable income.

After the end of the siege and the defeat of the Ottomans, Eparchos decided to take refuge in Venice with his family. He arrived in Venice in 1537 and became a member of the Greek Brotherhood in 1540. In 1543, he is living in Venice knowing perfect Greek and being a great collector and copyist of ancient codices. This gave him the advantage of establishing himself as the most serious supplier of manuscripts in Venice.

The contribution of Eparchos in the spread of ancient and medieval Greek literature was extremely important. He provided manuscripts of Ancient Greek authors to many important libraries around Europe such as the Vatican Library, the Escorial Library in Spain, the Laurentian Library in Florence, the Ambrosian Library in Milan, the Berlin State Library and to some private-owned libraries as well.

Eparchos was known for writing many letters. Most of them refer to personal matters but others are letters-appeals to church personalities sent in order to deal with the Ottoman Turks. It's also known that Eparchos was writing letters and communicating with the famous German reformer Philip Melanchthon.

It was from a letter, in 1568 when Eparchos was 77 years old, which we learn that he suffered from gout. This was his final letter and the latest news from him. He died, most likely from the aforementioned disease, in 1571. He left one daughter and two sons, the eldest of whom was named Nikephoros.

== Works ==
- Ὑποτύπωσις τῆς Ὀτομάνων Τυραννίδος καὶ ποίω τρόπω ταύτην καταστρέψασθαι (Depiction of the Ottoman Tyranny and the way to destroy it)

The work was written in 1538-39 during the 3rd Ottoman-Venetian War. Eparchos suggests, that the struggle against the Ottomans must be waged within the Ottoman state itself with an attack from three different spots. It has been argued that, in his work, he tries to imitate the style of ancient writers and particularly of the ancient Greek orator Demosthenes.

- Θρῆνος είς τὴν Ἑλλάδος καταστροφήν (Lament for Greece's catastrophe)

This work is a poem. It resulted in invocations to the leaders of the Christian West to unite and attack the common enemy, the Ottoman Empire. It was published in Venice in 1544, but it is possible that its writing had begun after the Siege of Corfu in 1537. It is written in Homeric Greek and it consists of 103 elegiac couplets.

== See also ==
- Greek scholars in the Renaissance
