= John Servopoulos =

John Servopoulos (fl. 1484–1500) was a Greek scribe and scholar. Few details are known about his life. He was originally from Constantinople but from at least 1484 he was living in England where he copied Greek manuscripts for a living. From 1489 he was apparently working from the abbey of Reading and he was active there until at least 1500. Some of his manuscripts may have been destined for students or teachers at the nearby University of Oxford. William Grocyn, who worked as an English scholar, owned several of his manuscripts and so was probably one of his patrons.

== Known works ==
- Translation of A Grammar by Theodore Gazes.

== See also ==
- Greek scholars in the Renaissance
- Harris, Jonathan, Greek Émigrés in the West, 1400–1520 (Camberley: Porphyrogenitus, 1995)
- Harris, Jonathan, 'Greek scribes in England: the evidence of episcopal registers', in Through the Looking Glass: Byzantium through British Eyes, ed. Robin Cormack and Elizabeth Jeffreys(Aldershot: Ashgate, 2000), pp. 121–6. ISBN 0-86078-667-6.
- Weiss, Roberto, Humanism in England during the Fifteenth Century (Oxford, 1957, 2nd ed.)
