= Mathew Devaris =

Greek scholar

Mathew Devaris was a Greek scholar during the Renaissance.

He was born in Corfu but migrated to Rome Italy at a young age. He was a student of Janus Lascaris and is known to have published Eustathius of Thessalonica's scholia or commentary on Homer between 1542 and 1550.

== Known works ==
- Un premier catalogue des manuscrits grecs

...

== See also ==
- Greek scholars in the Renaissance
