= Janus Plousiadenos =

Janus Plousiadenos (Greek: Ιωάννης Πλουσιαδηνός, Ioannis Plousiadenos, episcopal name: Ιωσήφ, Ioseph; circa 1429-1500) was a 15th-century Greek Renaissance scholar, hymnographer and composer born in Crete. Plousiadenos was in favor of the Union of the Eastern Orthodox and Catholic Churches and wrote extensively on the subject. The 1455 Defensio synodi Florentinae, often misattributed to Gennadius Scholarius is in fact his work. Plousiadenos was also an avid composer and hymnographer and dedicated several of his works to his friend and fellow Greek scholar Cardinal Bessarion. His sacred compositions for the Orthodox church use a discantus technique, thus achieving a polyphonic texture, a practice that underlines the innovative character of his works in regard to the usually considered as monophonic "byzantine chant" just before the fall of the Eastern Roman Empire.

== Known works ==
- Defensio synodi Florentinae, 1455
- Several sacred compositions for the Orthodox rite, mostly in discantus practice.

== See also ==
- Greek scholars in the Renaissance
