= Andreas Musalus =

Greek mathematician, philosopher and architectural theorist

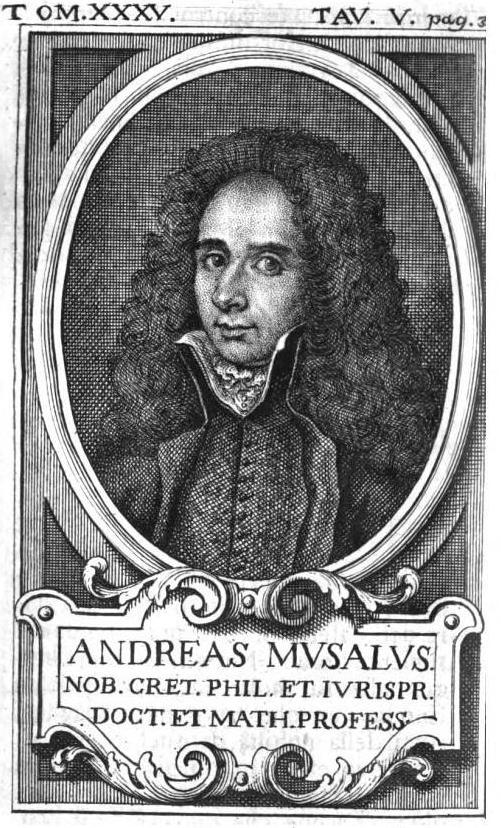
- A portrait of Andreas Musalus.
- Born: Andreas Mousalos; 1665/6; Candia, Crete
- Died: 1721; Venice, Italy
- Occupations: Mathematics, Architecture, Philosophy
- Writing career
- Literary movement: Italian Renaissance

Andreas Musalus (Latin: Andreas Musalus, Italian: Andrea Musalo, Greek: Ανδρέας Μουσάλος; c. 1665/6 – c. 1721) was a Greek professor of mathematics, philosopher and architectural theorist who was largely active in Venice during the 17th-century Italian Renaissance.

== Biography ==
Andreas Musalus was born to a noble Greek family in 1665, in Candia on the island of Crete. His family were originally from Constantinople and his father was a doctor by profession. Due to the Ottoman conquest of Crete the family migrated to Venice when Andreas was an infant. Andreas began studying in his adolescence, he ultimately studied law and mathematics at the University of Padua. Whilst in Padua Musalus studied the rhetoric of Pietro Paolo Calore and learned mathematics from Filippo Vernade, the Lieutenant General of Artillery of the Republic of Venice. Vernade taught Musalus mathematics of military architecture. Musalus continued his studies and made such immense progress in mathematics that in 1697 at the age of thirty two years, he was assigned to teach mathematics in Venice. He married in the year 1707, he died in 1721, in the region of Venice.

== See also ==
- Greek scholars in the Renaissance
