= Virginia Sanjust di Teulada =

Former Italian television announcer and host (born 1977)

Virginia Sanjust of Teulada (born 9 April 1977) is a former Italian television announcer and television host.

== Family ==
Born in Rome, she is the daughter of Antonellina Interlenghi and John Sanjust of Teulada, on the maternal side, and the grand daughter of actor and director Franco Interlenghi and actress Antonella Lualdi. On the paternal side, she descends from the Sardinian aristocratic family of Sanjust Teulada and is a direct great-grand daughter of Edmund Sanjust Teulada. Married young, she had a son in 1998, but the marriage lasted a little over one year.

== Career ==
She made her debut on the small screen leading the section of the Sunday night of Rai Uno, Oltremoda, replacing the leader Fernanda Lessa. Fame arrived September 21, 2003 when she was chosen as the new announcer television Rai Uno, along with Barbara Matera, a position she held until November 2004. In 2004, she sent special in the program A Special Day, while in 2006 all its leads a space digital channel Rai Futura.
