= Gerasimos Vlachos =

Greek renaissance humanist (1607–1685)

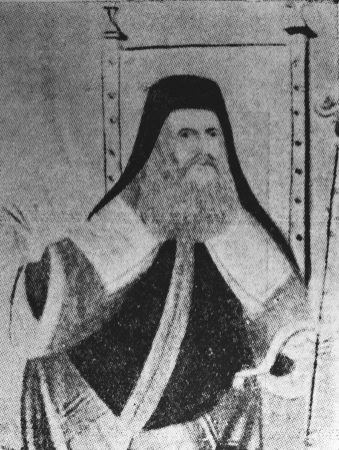
1938 drawing of Vlachos by Manouil Gideon

Gerasimos Vlachos (1607–1685) was a Greek scholar of the Renaissance.

Vlachos was born in Heraklion, Crete (then part of the Republic of Venice) in 1607, but he migrated to Venice early on and was a student and associate of fellow Greek scholar Theophilos Corydalleus. He specialised in Ancient Greek philosophy and among his writings was The Definitive Harmony of Things According to Greek Thinkers (Venice 1661). He died in 1685.

Among his known works is The Definitive Harmony of Things According to Greek Thinkers.
