= Totius Graeciae Descriptio =

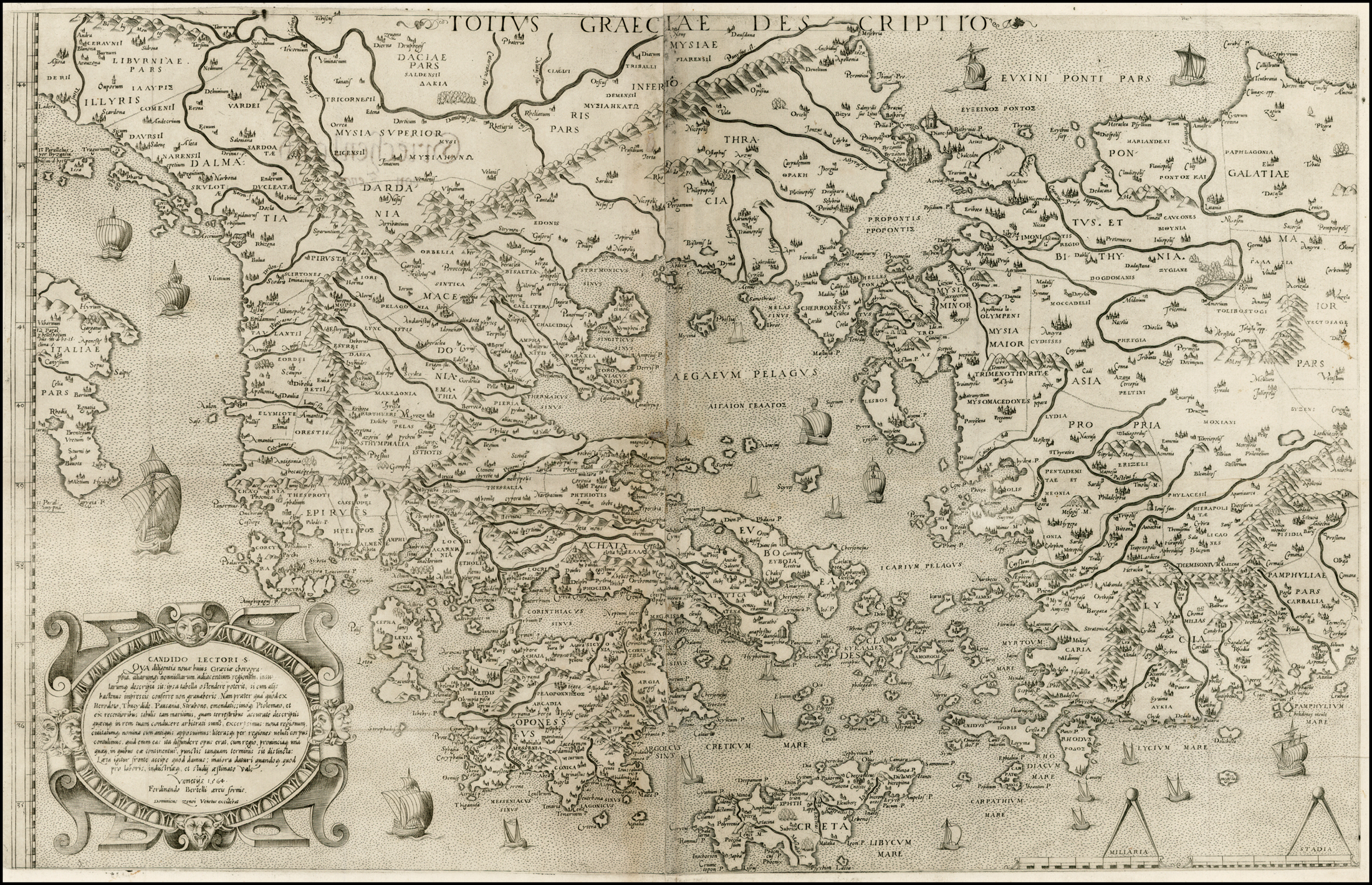
A 1558 version of the map

Totius Graeciae Descriptio refers to an early antiquarian map of Greece drawn by Renaissance humanist Nikolaos Sophianos that became a cartographical bestseller of the late 16th century. It is eight pages and shows Greece from mythical times to the founding of the Eastern Roman Empire and the establishment of Christianity. The map draws on many classical historians and thinkers, including Ptolemy, Herodotus, Thucydides, Strabo, and Pausanias.

== History ==
The map was first published during Sophianos's time in Rome in 1540. It was published by Francesco Salamanca It was often copied and plagiarized, until it was finally standardized by inclusion in Ortelius's historical atlas, the Parergon, in 1579. The creation of the map is an example of the movement in the sixteenth century of revived studies of Ancient Greece. Sophianos also integrates an attempt to merge the classical and contemporary by using ancient geographical names on a contemporary map, which reflected a societal interest in linking many aspects together, including Greece and Rome, Catholicism and Orthodoxy, and even Paganism and Christianity.

== Details of the map ==
The map is labeled principally in Latin, and in addition Greek is given for certain seas and regions. Early editions of the map displayed only the ancient Greek names for cities, however later editions also showed modern names.

=== Representations of Major Cities ===
Certain cities are given special representation on Sohpianos's map because of their cultural, political, or historical significance:

- Athens is represented as the principal city on the map, with the Acropolis at its center, its harbor at Piraeus, and long walls enclosing the city.
- Byzantium is depicted with high walls surrounding the Cathedral of Saint Sophia.
- Delphi and Delos are drawn as temples and labeled because of their religious significance.
- Troy is the only settlement to be shown as ruins, and represents the oldest level of Greek history shown on the map.

== Comparisons with Ptolemy's Geography ==
Initially, Sophianos's map is based on Ptolemy's Geography. This is apparent in the shape of the coastlines, rivers, and division of Greece. However, Sophianos departed from Ptolemy's work by describing ancient Greek geography. A notable feature is how Sophianos's Greece covers the Balkans south of the Danube and western Asia Minor, whereas Ptolemy's extends to north to Epirus and Macedonia. Also, Ptolemy limited his geographical names to the contemporary second century place names, while Sophianos takes names from all of Greek history, from the Argonauts and the Trojan War, to the late Roman period. The map also shows nearly 2,000 place names of Greek antiquity, double that of Ptolemy.

== Lost Editions ==
The first editions of the map (1540–1545) are believed to be lost. Some references were collected and published by Emile Legrand in 1885 and this data was the basis for recent bibliographical entries. From literary allusions, it was established that the first editions were published in 1540. Examples of the 1545 edition have been rediscovered and it is now possible to reconstruct the map's history and content thus shedding light on the methodology and practice of early modern antiquarian cartography of Greece.

== Re-Issues ==
Totius Graeciae Descriptio was warmly received by contemporary cartographers, and was indirectly adopted as the definition of modern Greece. Consequently, the profound map was reprinted many times.

- The first was in Basel in 1544 and 1545 by Oporin. The eight page map is believed to be very similar to Sophianos's original map in the essentials. It is dedicated to Cosimo de'Medici. For the 1545 edition, Oporin commissioned an introduction, called the Praefatio, from Nicholas Gerbel, which was a 90-page folio describing the academic use of the elaborate map, elaborating on how to color the map, as well as other aspects. The Praefatio also included 21 woodcut imaginary illustrations of Greek cities. Also, all of the over 2,000 place names are listed in the Praefatio. It is unclear if Sophianos had any influence on the writing of the Praefatio. Both the 1544 and 1545 versions were assumed to be lost, until a copy of the 1545 edition surfaced at an auction at Sotheby's, London in 2004.
- In 1550, Oporin re-issued a revised edition of the Praefatio in Basel, now numbering over 300 pages, further detailing the analytical geographic history of Greece, physical descriptions of geographical features, and culture of ancient Greece.
- Also in 1545, another edition was being printed in Venice by Giovanni Andrea Vavassore. It was much smaller, only two pages. It is believed that Sophianos was involved with the printing of this edition, as he was in Venice at the time of printing. This suggests that the Venice printing may be the closest to the original 1540 printing that was lost.
- Yet another edition was printed in 1552 in Rome. It was printed from four copper plates and is said to have been the closest to the original by Hieronymus in 1984. Additional editions were published in 1558, 1562, 1564, 1566, and 1569, all with slight alterations.
- In 1579, the map was finally standardized by Abraham Ortelius's atlas the Parergon, and was based directly on the 1545 Basel print. Subsequently, several other editions were published, with different dedications and Praefatio's into the 17th century.

== See also ==
- Greek scholars in the Renaissance
- Nikolaos Sophianos
- Ancient Greece
