= Nicholas Kalliakis =

Greek scholar and philosopher (1645–1707)

Nicholas Kalliakis (Νικόλαος Καλλιάκης)
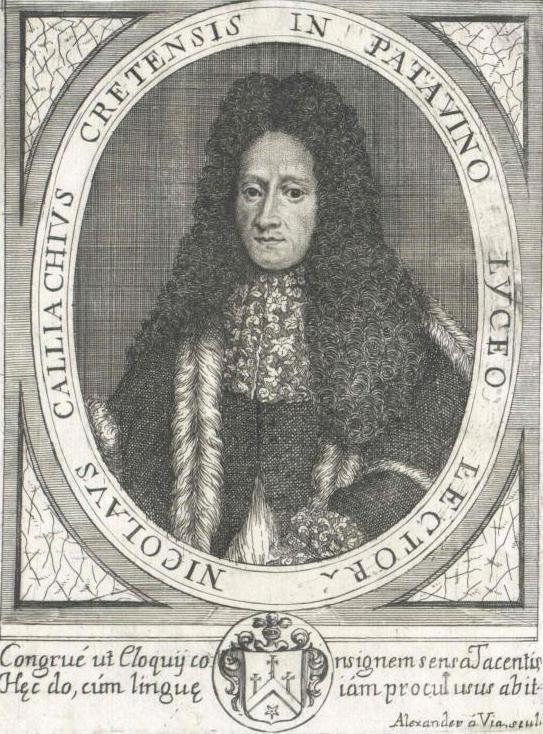
- A portrait of Nicholas Kalliakis
- Born: Nicholas Kalliakis (Νικόλαος Καλιάκης); 1645; Candia, Kingdom of Candia, Venetian Empire
- Died: 1707 (aged 61–62); Padua, Republic of Venice
- Occupations: Philosophy, Greek literature
- Writing career
- Literary movement: Italian Renaissance

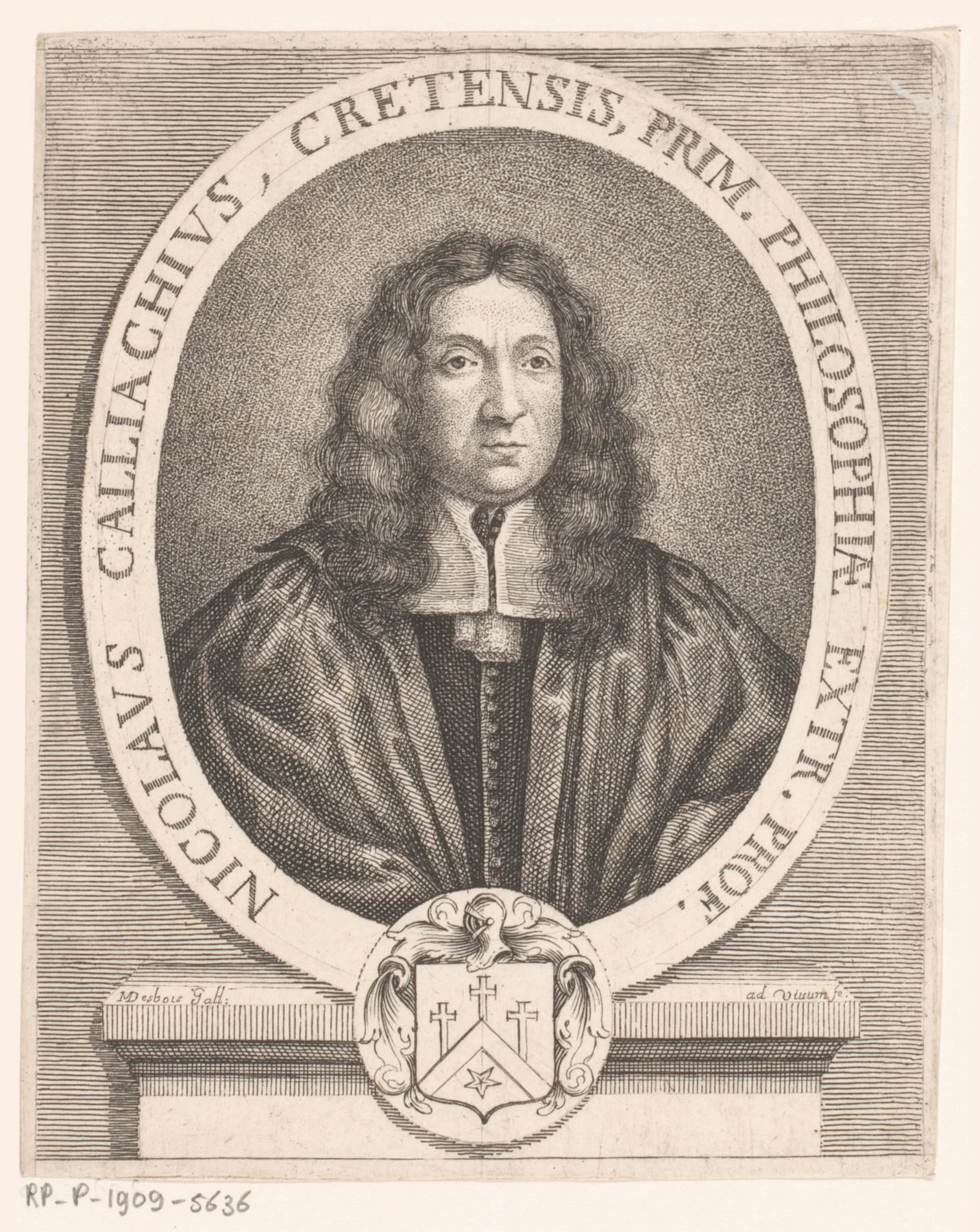
An elderly Nicholas Kalliakis in 1707.

Nicholas Kalliakis (Greek: Νικόλαος Καλλιάκης, Nikolaos Kalliakis; Latin: Nicolaus Calliachius; Italian: Niccolò Calliachi; c. 1645 - 8 May 1707) was a Cretan Greek scholar and philosopher who flourished in Italy in the 17th century. He was appointed doctor of philosophy and theology in Rome, university professor of Greek and Latin and Aristotelian philosophy at Venice in 1666 and professor of belles-lettres and rhetoric at Padua in 1667.

== Biography ==
Nicholas Kalliakis was born of Greek ancestry in Candia, Crete which was under control of Venice (present-day Greece) in 1645. He migrated to Rome where he stayed for ten years, becoming one of the outstanding teachers of Greek and Latin, he was ultimately made doctor of philosophy and theology. He moved to Venice in 1666 where he was appointed professor of Aristotelian philosophy and of the Greek and Latin languages. He was appointed Director of the Greek college (the Collegio Flangini) in Venice from 1665 to 1676. In 1677 Nicholas Kalliakis was invited to Padua and took the chair of professor of the belles-lettres and of philosophy and rhetoric. He wrote treatises on the antiquities of Greece and Rome and studied the dance in classical antiquity, his principal work is the De ludis scenicis mimorum et pantomimorum syntagma. He remained in Padua until 1707 where he died.

== See also ==
- Greek scholars in the Renaissance
