= Thomas Flanginis =

Greek-Venetian humanist (1578–1648)

Thomas Flanginis (Tommaso Flangini)
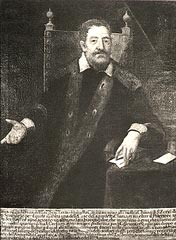
- Born: 1578; Corfu, Republic of Venice
- Died: 1648 (aged 69–70)

Philosophical work
- Main interests: Greek literature

Thomas Flanginis (Greek: Θωμάς Φλαγγίνης, Italian: Tommaso Flangini; 1578–1648) was a wealthy Greek lawyer and merchant in Venice, who founded the Flanginian School, a Greek college where many teachers were trained. The ‘Flanginian School’ established by Thomas Flanginis remained a renowned establishment for several centuries. He owned the Palazzo Flangini in Venice.

His father Apostolos Thomas was originally from the island of Corfu while his mother Maria Flangini was from the island of Cyprus.

== See also ==
- Greek community in Venice
- Greek scholars in the Renaissance
