= Flanginian School =

- Φλαγγίνειος Σχολή; Collegio Flanginiano

Location
- Venice; Republic of Venice; 45°26′08″N 12°20′41″E

Information
- Type: Secondary school
- Established: 1664–1665; 361 years ago
- Founder: Thomas Flanginis
- Closed: 1905; 121 years ago
- Gender: Boys
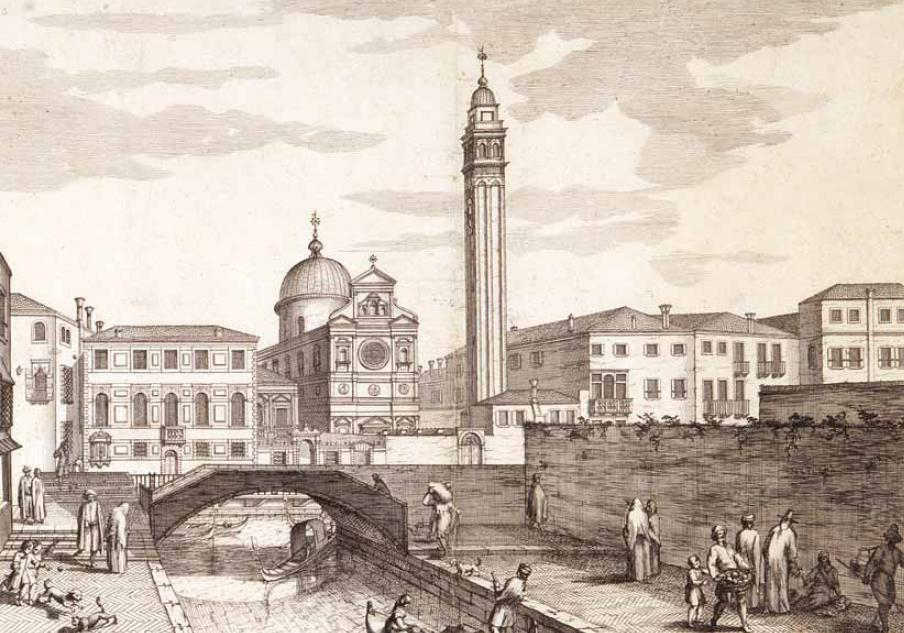
- Flanginian school (left) and San Giorgio dei Greci (center)

The Flanginian School (Greek: Φλαγγίνειος Σχολή; Italian: Collegio Flanginiano) was a Greek educational institution that operated in Venice, Italy, from 1664–1665 to 1905. The Flanginian produced several teachers who contributed to the modern Greek Enlightenment of the 17th and 18th centuries.

== Background ==
The Greek community in Venice, dating from the Byzantine era, had become the largest foreign community in the city during the end of the 16th century, numbering between 4,000 and 5,000, mostly concentrated in the Castello district (sestiere). Moreover, it was one of the economically strongest Greek communities of that time outside the Ottoman Empire.

== History ==
In 1626 a wealthy Greek merchant who lived in Venice, Thomas Flanginis, offered to the community a large sum of money for the foundation of a new school. The project for the construction of the school was entrusted to the famous Venetian architect Baldassare Longhena. The Flanginian school, named after its sponsor, started to function in 1664, with students from various Greek-populated regions.

The teaching staff included famous Greek scholars and representatives of the modern Greek Enlightenment, including Theophilos Korydaleus, Eugenios Voulgaris, Ioannis Chalkeus and Ioannis Patoussas. The curriculum included advanced philosophy, rhetoric, philology and logic. The Flanginian produced a total of 550 graduates during the 214 years of its existence (1665–1797 and 1823–1905). Its graduates had the opportunity to continue their studies at Padua University, in order to obtain a doctoral degree. The school began to decline after the dissolution of the Venetian Republic (1797), and finally closed in 1905.

== Literature ==
The school is perhaps best remembered for an anthology of prose and poetry entitled Flowers of Piety (Greek: Άνθη Ευλαβείας, 1708), which was composed by the students of the school, made up of epigrams, both in ancient Greek and Latin, Sapphic odes, Italian sonnets, and, most significantly, prose and verse compositions in (Demotic) modern Greek. It offers the first surviving Demotic Greek poetry following the termination of the Cretan Renaissance. Additional works composed by the staff of the Flanginian are "Greece's Homage to the Venetian Senate", and a literary encyclopedia by Ioannis Patousas composed in four volumes, which was a valuable resource for Greek schools operating in the Ottoman Empire.

== Location ==
The school was located in the Campo dei Greci, near the Greek Orthodox church of Saint George. Today the building of the Flanginian School houses the Hellenic Institute of Byzantine and Post-Byzantine Studies in Venice. The building was conserved at the initiative of Sophia Antoniadis.
