= Giustina Levi-Perotti =

Giustina Levi-Perotti of Sassoferrato was the (likely fictitious) 14th-century Jewish author of two Petrarchan sonnets.

The first, a sonnet beginning "Io vorrei pur drizzar queste mie piume," to which Petrarch is said to have replied with his sonnet "La gola, il sonno, e l'oziose piume," was published for the first time in 1564 by G. A. Gilio, who, however, attributed it to Ortensia di Guglielmo of Fabriano. It was republished by Giacomo Filippo Tomasini (Petrarca Redivivus, 1635), who attributed it to Giustina. Subsequently, it was included in various collections of poetry, down to 1885. Although Crescimbeni, Tiraboschi, and Zeno doubted the authenticity of the sonnet, scholars like Quadrio and, with some hesitation, Foscolo accepted it. Claudio Morici and later literary critics concluded that the sonnet is the work of a 16th-century writer, and that Giustina Levi-Perotti never existed.
