= Alessandra Scala =

Florentine humanist and scholar (1475–1506)

Alessandra Scala (1475–1506) was an Italian humanist and scholar of Latin and Greek in the late fifteenth century.

Born in Colle di Val d'Elsa, she was an amateur actress during the 1490s, portraying Electra in a Florentine performance of Sophocles's Electra. The only two pieces of Scala's work that survive are her letters to her fellow writer Cassandra Fedele and a poem written in the Greek language.

== Biography ==
Alessandra Scala was the fifth daughter of the chancellor of Florence at the time, Bartolomeo Scala, and was born in 1475. Scala was taught in part by her father and Angelo Poliziano, and also studied Ancient Greek under Janus Lascaris and Demetrios Chalkokondyles.

In 1493, Scala participated in a Florentine performance of Sophocles's Electra as Electra, and was highly praised for her acting in a letter from Poliziano to Cassandra Fedele. She also corresponded with Fedele in Latin about marriage and scholarship between 1492 and 1493, and replied to love poems written in Greek that Poliziano sent her around 1493. Poliziano's praise of Scala's dramatic performance and his poetry addressed to her have been interpreted differently by scholars. While Pesenti views Poliziano as expressing genuine if unrealizable affection, more recently Feng and Jardine have argued that Poliziano's language draws upon previously established portrayals of a "beloved" in Renaissance love poetry, and that his portrayals did not treat Scala as an intellectual or scholarly equal to Poliziano. The only two pieces of Scala's work that survive, at least as far as Pesenti was able to find, are one of Scala's letters to Fedele and her poem in Greek replying to Poliziano.

In 1494, she married the Greek poet and soldier Michael Tarchaniota Marullus. Six years later Marullus died, and Scala then entered the Florentine convent of San Pier Maggiore – Strocchia notes that it was the oldest and richest convent in the city, whose nuns were traditionally drawn from what Miller terms "the ruling class" of Florence. She died there in 1506.
