= Michael Tarchaniota Marullus =

Greek Renaissance scholar, Neo-Latin poet, humanist and soldier (c. 1458 – 1500)

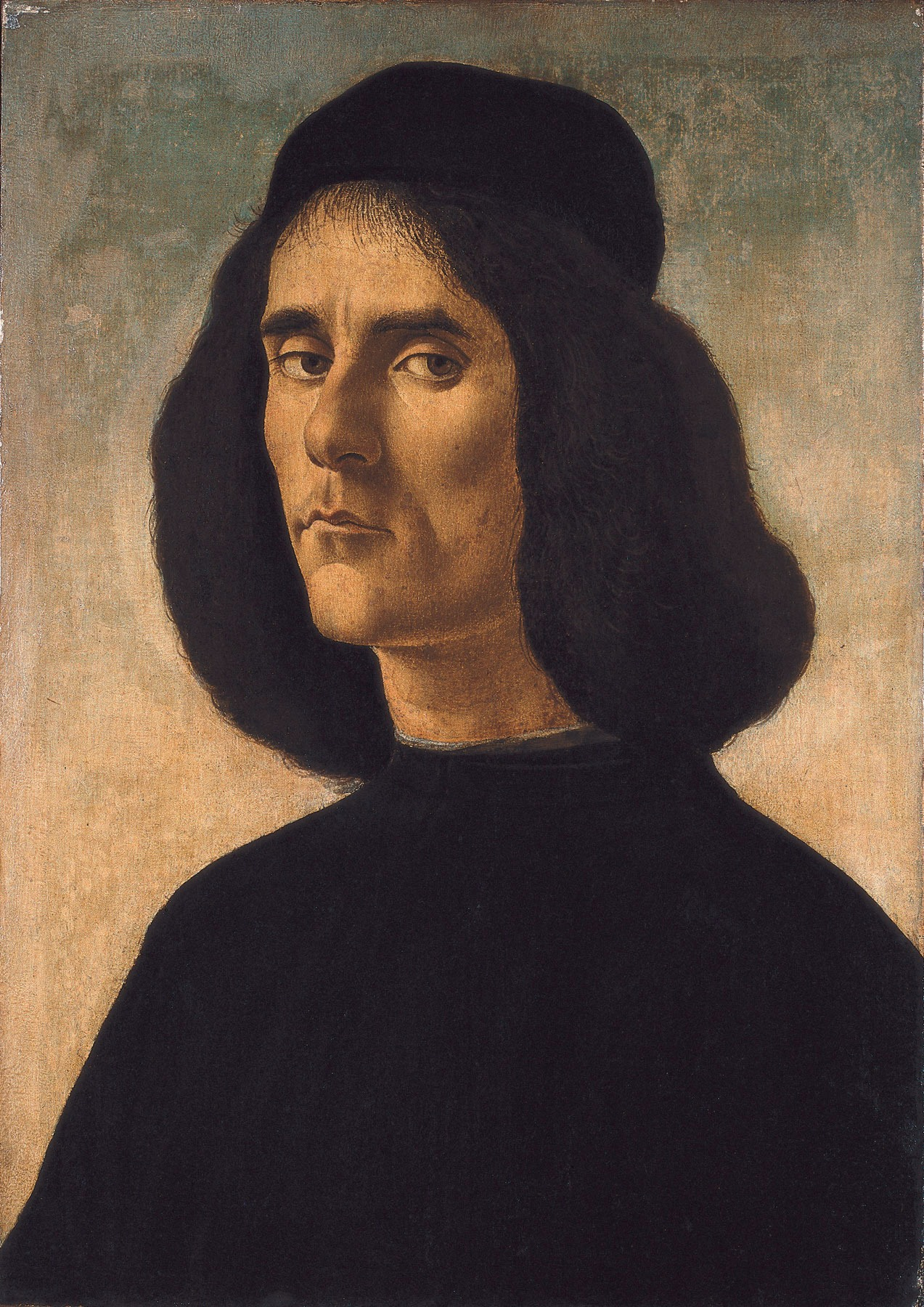
- Portrait of Michael Marullus by Sandro Botticelli in about 1496.
- Born: Μιχαήλ Μάρουλλος Ταρχανειώτης c. 1458; Constantinople or Despotate of the Morea
- Died: 10 April 1500 (aged 41–42); Volterra, Republic of Florence
- Occupations: Poet, soldier, humanist
- Spouse: Alessandra Scala (m. 1494–1500)
- Writing career
- Movement: Italian Renaissance

Michael Tarchaniota Marullus (Greek: Μιχαήλ Μάρουλλος Ταρχανειώτης; Italian: Michele Marullo Tarcaniota; c. 1458 – 10 April 1500) was a Greek Renaissance scholar, Neo-Latin poet, humanist and soldier.

== Life ==
Michael Tarchaniota Marullus was born to a family of Greek ancestry. Details of his biography are obscure: he was born in either Constantinople or near the site of ancient Sparta in the Despotate of the Morea on the Peloponnese. His father was known as Manoli Marulo (Μανώλης Μάρουλλος) and his mother was Euphrosyne Tarchaneiotissa (Ευφροσύνη Ταρχανειώτισσα). The name Tarchaniotes was borne by a noble Byzantine family and it probably derives from Tarchanion, a village of Thrace. Another Tarchaniotes, Ioannes, who was the author of several literary works in Greek and Latin in the 16th century, was a relative of Marullus'.

Both of Marullus' parents were Greek exiles who had fled from Constantinople when it fell to the Turks in 1453,

Due to the Ottoman expansion in the 1460s, he fled with his parents to the Republic of Ragusa, where he spent his earliest years. From there, the family travelled further to Italy. He was educated in Italy, in Ancona, and also perhaps in Venice and Padua. Marullus travelled from city to city as a composer of Latin poetry and an ardent advocate of a crusade against the Ottoman Turks. In the 1470s, he fought as a common Stratioti against Turks in the Crimea. In order to liberate his subjugated homeland from domination he was willing to take up arms himself and allied with the king of France when he planned to go on a crusade. In Italy, he served under the cavalry captain Nicholas Rolla, a Lacedemonian.

Through his poetry, Marullus got in contact with many influential people of his time, including popes, kings and members of the Medici family. In Florence in 1494, he married the learned Alessandra Scala (1475–1506), daughter of Bartolomeo Scala. On 10 April 1500, after visiting with the humanist Raffaello Maffei in Volterra, he was riding in full armour to join the armed forces against Cesare Borgia when he drowned with his horse in the river Cecina near Volterra.

The only substantial biography of Marullus is by Carol Kidwell. In Marullus, Soldier Poet of the Renaissance (London, 1989), she reveals the life of a soldier-poet who roamed exotic lands, composed poems at the borders of the Black Sea, and participated in a military campaign of Vlad the Impaler (the inspiration for Dracula). Yet Kidwell is not sensitive to the manipulative moves in Marullus's "autobiographical" poems. These, and their implications, have been explored in more detail by Karl Enenkel in his chapter on the poet (see Die Erfindung des Menschen: Die Autobiographik des frühneuzeitlichen Humanismus von Petrarca bis Lipsius (Berlin, 2008), pp. 368–428). Enenkel argues that it is improbable that Marullus was born in Constantinople. On the contrary, he suggests that the poet was born after the city fell to the Sultan in 1453. The French poet Pierre de Ronsard (1524–1585) considered Marullus as one of his teachers and dedicated an epitaph to him.

== Works ==
Marullus composed a large and varied collection of epigrams in four books. Some of his best love poems were later appropriated by Pierre de Ronsard and others. Marullus also composed a collection of hymns, the Hymni naturales, in which he celebrates the ancient Olympian pantheon. His Institutiones principales, or the education of princes, he left unfinished. An ardent reader of the Roman philosopher-poet Lucretius, he proposed some valuable emendations which were not published until 1513.

Marullus's opera omnia was first edited by Alessandro Perosa in 1951. The Hymnes and the Institutiones are available in translation. Both works were translated into German by Otto Schönberger (Würzburg 1996 and 1997). In addition, the Hymnes were translated in Italian by Donatella Coppini (Florence, 1995), and in French by Jacques Chomarat (Genève, 1995). In 2012, the Harvard I Tatti series published the first English translation of Marullus' poetry by Charles Fantazzi.

== See also ==
- Greek scholars in the Renaissance
