= Laonikos Chalkokondyles =

Byzantine Greek historian (c. 1430 – c. 1470)

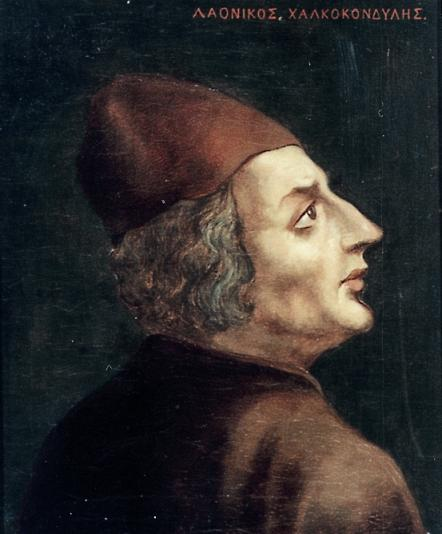
- Early modern painting of Laonikos Chalkokondyles
- Born: c. 1430; Athens, Duchy of Athens
- Died: c. 1470
- Occupation: Historian
- Notable work: The Histories
- Relatives: Demetrios Chalkokondyles (cousin)

Laonikos Chalkokondyles (Greek: Λαόνικος Χαλκοκονδύλης; (Note: from λαός 'people', νικᾶν 'to be victorious', an anagram of Nikolaos which bears the same meaning) c. 1430 – c. 1470), (Note: The family name 'Chalkokondyles' is from χαλκός 'brass' and κόνδυλος 'knuckle'.) also latinized as Laonicus Chalcocondyles, was a late medieval Greek historian from Athens. He is known for his Ἀποδείξεις Ἱστοριῶν (latinized: Apodeixis Historion, variously translated as Demonstrations of Histories or The Histories) in ten books, which record the last 150 years of the Byzantine Empire. According to historian Angeliki Laiou, Chalkokondyles was the first to use Byzantine to refer to the state as he advocated a neo-Hellenic identity of the Romans.

Laonikos Chalkokondyles was born to an aristocratic family in Florentine-run Duchy of Athens circa 1430–32. Laonikos' birth name was Nikolaos but he adopted the classical sounding anagram Laonikos to emphasize his classical Greek learning and interests. This was an intellectual trend that Laonikos shared with other members of his intellectual circle in Byzantine Mystras, such as Georgios Gemistos Plethon and Bessarion. In the first half of the fifteenth century, Athens was under the rule of the Florentine family of the Acciajuoli to whom the Chalkokondyli were connected by marriage ties.

== Early life ==
The Chalkokondyles were one of the oldest native families in Athens and had gained great prominence. At the time of Laonikos, the Duchy was ruled by the Florentine Acciaioli family. His father George was a kinsman of Maria Melissene, the wife of Duke Antonio I Acciaioli. In The Histories, Laonikos claims that his father George Chalkokondyles visited the Ottoman Sultan Murad II (r. 1421–1444, 1446–1451) twice on diplomatic missions.

When Duke Antonio died in 1435, Maria attempted to secure control of the Duchy of Athens and sent George on a diplomatic mission to Murad II, asking that the government of Athens be entrusted to herself and George Chalkokondyles. During his absence however, a young scion of the Acciaiuoli family, Nerio II, was proclaimed Duke of Athens. Meanwhile, George's proposal was rejected, despite offering the Sultan 30,000 gold pieces, and he was instead cast into prison. George Chalkokondyles managed to escape to Constantinople, according to William Miller "leaving his retinue, tents and beasts of burden behind him", but after leaving Constantinople by ship, he was captured by an Athenian ship and taken back to the Sultan, who pardoned him. George with Laonikos and the rest of the family relocated to the Peloponnese, which was still under Byzantine rule as the Despotate of the Morea.

In 1446 Constantine Palaiologos, then Despot of the Morea, sent George on a new diplomatic mission to Murad II to obtain the independence of the Greek states south of Thermopylae; enraged at the offered terms, the Sultan once again put George Chalkokondyles into prison, then marched on Constantine's forces holding the Hexamilion wall on the Isthmus of Corinth. Murad bombarded it for three days, destroying the fortifications, and subsequently massacred the defenders and pillaged the countryside, ending all hopes of its independence. The relevant passage in the Apodeixis which describes the siege presents the event from the viewpoint of a witness. It has thus been proposed by Miller that Laonikos was "evidently" an eye-witness to this battle, although the historian Theodore Spandounes claims Laonikos was the secretary of Murad II and present at the Battle of Varna in 1444.

The one glimpse we have of Laonikos himself is in the summer of 1447, when Cyriacus of Ancona met him in the summer of 1447 at the court of Constantine Palaiologos at Mystra. Cyriacus describes him as a youth egregie latinis atque grecis litteris eruditum ('surprisingly learned in Latin and Greek literature'). It was at Mystra where Laonikos was in the circle of George Gemistos Plethon (Pletho). Although Laonikos does not openly reference Pletho in the Apodeixis, his conceptualization of Hellenic identity, religious iconoclasm, approach to Islam, and philosophy of history bear the mark of the Platonist philosopher. Pletho and Laonikos also owned the same fourteenth-century manuscript of Herodotus by Demetrius Triclines, which bears a bi-folio in Pletho's handwriting and an epigraph on the last folio. The manuscript also includes alternating alternating symbols of the sun and moon.

Laonikos' movements and actions after 1447 are not known with certainty. His account of the circumcision of Sultan Mehmed II's sons in 1457 suggest he was an eye-witness to the event, and his account of Ottoman finances indicate he interviewed the Sultan's accountants. Internal evidence has led Byzantinist Anthony Kaldellis to put the date which Laonikos stopped writing his Histories as 1464. While Laonikos Chalkokondyles greatly relied on Ottoman sources for the sections on the Ottomans, his narrative on the rule of Mehmed II is generally antagonistic. Thus, it has been argued that Laonikos Chalkokondyles was writing for the contemporary western audience in the Turcica genre rather than for the post-Byzantine intellectuals associated with the Ottoman court. Other speculations about Laonikos Chalkokondyles' life are not as widely accepted.

== Teaching by Pletho ==
While in Mystras, Laonikos became the student of Pletho, a Platonist philosopher and Judge General of the Byzantine Empire. At the court of the Despots in Mystras, Pletho was an advisor to Byzantine rulers and taught a wide range of students. Among them were Bessarion and Isidore, the two future Cardinals of the Catholic Church, Mark Eugenikos, the leader of Orthodox factions who resisted Church Union with Rome. At the same time Michael Apostolis and the self-professed sun worshipper Demetrios Raoul Kabakes were also followers of Pletho, although they may not have been formal students. Kabakes was instrumental in disseminating the remaining portions of Pletho's secret tract Nomoi ('Laws') in Europe. The Nomoi had been burned by the Patriarch of Constantinople, Gennadius Scholarius, Pletho's Aristotelian arch-enemy and anti-Unionist theologian, following the Platonist philosopher's death when the Patriarch was sent the tract around 1455. In connection with the auto-da-fé, Scholarios had commented that Pletho had become a Hellene (that is, a pagan) as a result of his education under a Hellenizing Jewish thinker at an unspecified barbarian city in his youth. Historians have argued that this city must have been either Ottoman Bursa or Edirne without conclusive evidence; it could have been any one of the Muslim courts in the eastern Mediterranean.

There are echoes of this religious controversy in The Histories. In one passage, Laonikos defined Hellenic religion as polytheistic ritual belief in the gods Zeus, Hera, Apollo, and Artemis, and wrote that it was only recently that the "Bohemians" (Romani) stopped worshiping fire and the sun, while the pagan religion was still practiced at various locations in the fifteenth century. Laonikos' narrative on religious practices and beliefs, both Islam as well as Christianity, is conspicuous for its omission of metaphysics, instead defining religion as a cultural and administrative system that regulates societies. A passage concerning Bessarion, Isidore, Mark Eugenikos, and Gennadius Scholarius details the deliberations at the Council of Florence in 1438–9. At the Council the Byzantines and the Latins aimed to mend the Schism between the Orthodox and the Catholic Churches. In these passages and elsewhere, Laonikos systematically employs the classical term threskeia (religious practice) which has connotations of ritual and cult and never uses the term pistos 'faith'. The latter term was more commonly used in connection with religion in Byzantium.

Laonikos' instruction with Pletho in Mystras is revealed in a diary entry of Cyriac of Ancona from late July–early August 1447. The Italian merchant and humanist (who is sometimes also referred to as the father of modern archaeology) was visiting Pletho in Mystras when he met "the gifted young Athenian, Nikolaos Chalkokondyles.... remarkably learned in both Latin and Greek literature." Late medieval Greece was a hybrid society where bilingualism was a common feature and contacts with the west were frequent. Laonikos' detailed presentation of Italian city-states and western polities, intricate knowledge of past and current events in the west, admiration for the Greek Cardinals Bessarion and Isidore who had migrated to Italy, and capacity for salacious gossip from western urban centers reveal that he was a member of the Franko-Greek society of late medieval Greece. In fact, Laonikos was proud to draw the readers' attention to this, referring to himself as "Laonikos the Athenian" in the opening words of the Apodeixis.

Though Laonikos does not openly reference Pletho in The Histories, his influence is present within the text. Laonikos' adoption of Herodotus as historiographical model, the explicit emphasis on Hellenic identity in the text, the articulation of a long historical memory extending to mythical time, the sympathetic presentation of Islam and the prophet Mohammed, and interest in oracular knowledge are all similar in tenor to Pletho's teachings and writings.

== Methodology ==
Laonikos' methodological contribution to Renaissance historiography stemmed from his adoption of Herodotus as model. Although Herodotus was taught in Byzantine schools as a linguistic model for Ionian Greek, he was denigrated as an unreliable historian with a penchant for the fabulous in late antiquity and the middle ages. Furthermore, the classical historian's formulation of the tyrannical Persian empire in opposition to the free Greek city-states was not in line with Byzantine political ideology and its claim as a just and universal Empire. However, in the aftermath of the 1453 Fall of Constantinople and the incorporation of all Byzantine territories into the centralizing Ottoman state, Herodotus emerged as a useful historiographical model for describing the Ottoman Empire. Further, Laonikos' Herodotean model of Empire should be evaluated in tandem with Mehmed II's imperial claims. Such claims were applauded in the History of Kritoboulos, the contemporary Greek historian and bureaucrat. Kritoboulos dedicated and presented the Greek autograph manuscript of his History to the Ottoman Sultan himself, illustrating the competing claims on the Byzantine heritage in the latter part of the fifteenth century.

Laonikos must have studied the classical historian of the Persian Wars closely with Pletho in Mystras, given that the fourteenth-century Byzantine manuscript of Herodotus (Plut. Gr. 70.06 in the Laurentian Library in Florence) was owned by both teacher and student. Laonikos' epigraph on the last folio of the manuscript concerns the ancient historian, where he writes that Herodotus' Histories was composed with "divine guidance". This particular manuscript was copied multiple times by Pletho's disciples, among them Bessarion and Kabakes. Textual interventions—such as the insertion of alternating astronomical symbols of the sun and the moon in the margins, and the marking of oracular statements in the manuscript—and the close links between Plut. Gr. 70.06 and other manuscripts associated with the Mystra intellectuals, all demonstrate that Herodotus was not merely prized as a classical historian.

Laonikos' epigraph praises Herodotus as a "herald" who described in detail the deeds of the Hellenes. Laonikos was amazed that the Hellenes "displayed a virtue that was greater than human". Laonikos' word choice χρησάμενοι 'display', to refer to the Hellenes, is also used to describe oracular statements. In fact, Herodotus had cosmic significance for the Mystras intellectuals at a time when eschatological beliefs were widespread.

Thus, Laonikos' adoption of Herodotus was systematic, thorough, and methodical. He adopted the organizational scheme of the ancient historian as well as Herodotus' approach to source material. Arnaldo Momigliano has distinguished a Herodotean approach from the approach advocated by Thucydides, whose strict focus was on contemporary political events. Herodotus, whose main narrative on the clash between the Persians and the Hellenes occurred in a generation earlier, necessarily had to rely on oral reports from multiple sources. Moreover, Herodotus' numerous excursuses into cultural geography necessitated his reliance on foreign informants. Similarly, Laonikos constructed his narrative around the man wars between the Ottomans and the Byzantines, and in the process relied on Ottoman Turkish informants for political events, ethnographic details, origin stories, and much else. Laonikos incorporated extensive material on Ottoman kinship groups, language, religious beliefs, and customs, in line with Herodotus.

In the very long tradition of Byzantine historiography, such primary focus on the "other" and the "barbarian" was unprecedented, with the exception of Kritoboulos. With a composition date after 1464, Laonikos was one of the earliest narrative sources on Ottoman history in any language, and the only witness for many of the events and personalities he recorded. While Laonikos depicted Ottoman Sultan Murad II in a favorable light, his son Mehmed II was portrayed as an oriental tyrant par excellence, bringing to mind Herodotus' representations of Darius and Xerxes. Laonikos relied on Ottoman informants who maintained a critical distance to the Ottoman court, and the narrative contains echoes Ottoman social criticism towards Mehmed II's reign, which was only included in Ottoman historiographical tradition in the late fifteenth and sixteenth centuries.

While the criticism of Mehmed II's social and political policies was not put down on paper in the east (at least during the Sultan's reign), they circulated widely in the west thanks to The Histories. There are more than 30 manuscripts of the book from the fifteenth and sixteenth centuries, demonstrating its popularity. It was first printed in 1556 in Latin translation alongside other tracts on the Ottomans, and was reprinted numerous times due to the European demand for Ottoman information. Translations into French appeared in the sixteenth and seventeenth centuries, with some including illustrations and supplementary material. The original Greek text of the Apodeixis was printed only after its Latin and French translations, first appearing in a bilingual edition printed in 1615 Geneva. Laonikos' perspective on the Ottomans, and his revival of Herodotus historiographical model, molded much of subsequent western engagements with the east.

== The Histories ==
Chalkokondyles' most important historical work is his Histories (Ἀποδείξεις Ἱστοριῶν). This historical work comprises one of the most important sources on the final 150 years of Byzantine history, despite being defective in its chronology.

The work covers the period from 1298 to 1463, describing the fall of the Byzantine empire and the rise of the Ottoman Turks, which forms the centre of the narrative, down to the conquest of the Venetians and Mathias, king of Hungary, by Mehmed II. It depicts the fall of Constantinople as a historical event of far-reaching importance, and compares it to the fall of Troy. The book also sketches other manners and civilization of England, France, and Germany, who the Greeks had sought assistance from against the Turks. For his account of earlier events, Chalkokondyles was able to obtain information from his father.

He models the work after Ancient Greek historical texts, his language is tolerably pure and correct, and his style is simple and clear. The text, however, is in a very corrupt state. The use of archaic language made his texts hard to read in many parts, while the antiquarian names he gives to people of his time created confusion (Γέται, Δάκες, Λίγυρες, Μυσοί, Παίονες, Ἕλληνες). The extended use of the name Hellenes (Ἕλληνες), which Laonikos used to describe the Byzantines, contributed to the connection made between the ancient Greek civilization and the modern one.

=== Translations ===
Chalkokondyles' Histories was first published in a Latin translation by Konrad Klauser at Basel in 1556, although the translation itself bears the date of November 1544. A French translation was published by Blaise de Vigenère in 1577 with a later edition by Artus Thomas, with valuable illustrations on Turkish matters. The editio princeps of the Greek text had to wait until 1615 for J. B. Baumbach's printing.

The older Bonn corpus edition stays close to some of the manuscript readings: Historiarum Libri Decem, ed. I. Bekker, Corpus Scriptorum Historiae Byzantinae (Bonn 1843). The only critical edition of the work has been published by the Hungarian Byzantinist Eugenius Darkó: Historiae Demonstrationes, 2 volumes, ed. E. Darko, (Budapest 1922–7). The text can also be found in J.-P. Migne, Patrologia Graeca, volume 159.

A complete English translation (by Anthony Kaldellis) of The Histories was published in two volumes in 2014 by Harvard University Press, as volumes 33 and 34 of The Dumbarton Oaks Medieval Library. Partial translations include one of Books I–III in Laonikos Chalkokondyles. A Translation and Commentary of the Demonstrations of Histories, trans. Nikolaos Nikoloudis (Athens 1996) and another of Book VIII in J. R. Melville Jones, The Siege of Constantinople: Seven Contemporary Accounts (Amsterdam 1972), pp. 42–55.

== Portrayals in fiction ==
In the 1954 Albanian–Soviet movie The Great Warrior Skanderbeg, Laonikos Chalkokondyles is portrayed as an official historian at the Ottoman Court with opportunistic views on politics who tries to discourage Skanderbeg from an anti-Ottoman insurrection. After Skanderbeg leaves the Ottoman army and becomes leader of Albania on his own right, Chalkokondyles is brought as a hostage to his court to witness the First Siege of Krujë.

== See also ==
- Greek scholars in the Renaissance

== Bibliography ==
- Chalkokondyles, Laonikos (2014). The Histories. Vol. 1. Translated by Kaldellis, Anthony. Cambridge: Harvard University Press.
- Darkó, E. (1923–1924). "Zum Leben Laonikos Chalkondyles". Byzantinische Zeitschrift. 24: 29–39.
- Kaldellis, Anthony (2014). A New Herodotos: Laonikos Chalkokondyles on the Ottoman Empire, the Fall of Byzantium, and the Emergence of the West. Harvard University Press.
