= Laura Cereta =

Italian humanist and feminist writer

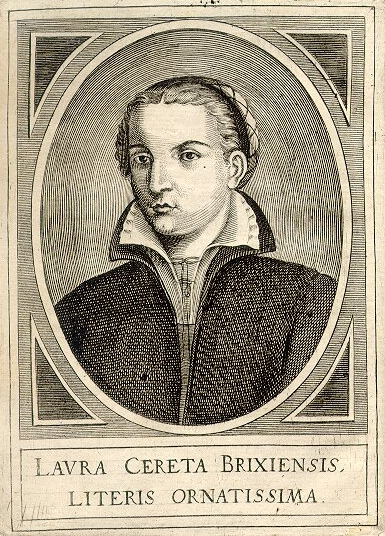
- Born: September 1469
- Died: 1499 (aged 29–30)
- Occupation: Writer
- Known for: Humanist and feminist writing

Laura Cereta (Brescia, September 1469 – 1499) was one of the most notable humanist and feminist writers of fifteenth-century Italy. Cereta was the first to put women’s issues and her friendships with women front and center in her work. Cereta wrote in Brescia, Verona, and Venice in 1488–92, known for her writing in the form of letters to other intellectuals. Her letters contained her personal matters and childhood memories, and discussed themes such as women’s education, war, and marriage. Like the first great humanist Petrarch, Cereta claimed to seek fame and immortality through her writing. It appeared that her letters were intended for a general audience.

== Life and career ==
Cereta was born in September 1469 in Brescia to a high-class family. She was a sickly child who suffered from sleeplessness. She was the first-born of six children. She had three brothers, Ippolito, Daniel, and Basilio, and two sisters, Deodata, and Diana. Her family was very popular in Italy due to her father's status. Silvestro Cereta was an attorney and a king's magistrate and her mother, Veronica di Leno, a famous businessperson. Since her father and Cereta believed in education, at age seven her father sent her to the convent. There she devoted her life to intellectual pursuits and began her academics; she learned religious principles, reading, writing, and Latin with the prioress. The prioress had a big influence in Cereta's life as her teacher, and mentor. The prioress taught Cereta to use late night to predawn hours while everyone else slept to embroider, write, and study. At the age of seven, her teacher guided her courses in Latin grammar. She also taught her how to draw pictures utilizing a needle, which she practiced herself day and night. After two years at the convent, her father requested that Cereta come home to take care of her siblings at the age of 10. After a few months at home, she went back to the convent for more schooling. At the age of twelve, her father summoned her again to come home to take on various household responsibilities, including supervising her brothers' education and serving as her father's secretary. It is likely that her father guided her post-elementary studies. At this time, Cereta showed great interest in mathematics, astrology, agriculture, and her favorite subject, moral philosophy.

In 1484, Cereta was married at age fifteen to Pietro Serina. Serina was a business merchant from Venice, yet had the same interests in academia. Difficulties between the two emerged in their marriage. In her letters to him, she wrote “You charge me with laziness and attack me for my long silence as though I were a defendant in court. You act as if I were the sort of person who would write to strangers and only neglect you, as though I were forgetful of you when in fact I accord you a place of honor above that of other learned men.” Despite the arguments, for Cereta, this was one of the happiest moments in her lifetime. In her letters, she imagined an ideal marriage as a partnership overseen by mutual honor, respect, honesty, and love. Cereta never regarded one's marriage as a kind of friendship, nor did she ever directly call her husband a friend. Nonetheless, in her letters, the languages of marriage and friendship were clearly delineated, focusing the readers' attention upon the reciprocal relations like mutual love, communication. She often focused the readers' attention on mutual relations such as love, communication and responsibility that manage both spousal and friendship. After eighteen months of marriage, her husband died from the plague. The two had no children and she never remarried.

Cereta finally recovered her spirits two years after the death of her husband and began immersing herself more deeply in her literary studies and works. She continued writing her letters to a close circle of family and friends, discussing personal concerns such as her difficult relationships with her mother and her husband. These letters also provided a detailed description of an early modern woman’s private experiences. Taken together, these letters are evidence of an individual woman and her persistent feminist concerns. She defended the concept of educating women and objected to the abuse of married women. Furthermore, in her public lectures and essays, Cereta explored the history of women's contributions to the intellectual and political life of Europe. She argued against the slavery of women in marriage and for the rights of women to higher education, the same issues that would occupy feminist thinkers in later centuries. Because of these themes, scholars such as Diana Robin consider her an early feminist. Throughout this time, she faced many critics, both male and female, who were jealous of her accomplishments and criticized her works. The two principal charges brought against her were that a woman should not receive an education and that her works were plagiarized, with her father writing them for her. She turned against her critics with aggressiveness. In response to one of her critics, Bibulus Sepromius, Laura said:

My ears are wearied by your carping. You brashly and publicly not merely wonder but indeed lament that I am said to possess as fine a mind as nature ever bestowed upon the most learned man. You seem to think that so learned a woman has scarcely been seen in the world. You are wrong on both counts, Sempronius, and have dearly strayed from the path of truth and disseminate falsehood…You pretend to admire me as a female prodigy, but there lurks sugared deceit in your adulation. You wait perpetually in ambush to entrap my lovely sex, and overcome by your hatred, seek to trample me underfoot and dash me to the earth.

In 1488, Cereta assembled 82 of her letters into a volume. The volume was based on the Petrarchan model called “Epistolae Familiares” and written with a burlesque dialogue on the "death of an ass". She dedicated it to her patron, Cardinal Ascanio Sforza. Her works circulated widely in Italy during the early modern era. However, this volume remained unpublished until the seventeenth century. The manuscript circulated from 1488 to 1492 among humanists in Brescia, Verona, and Venice. It is suspected that she did this to seek legitimization as a writer. Six months after her letters were published, her father died. After his death, she no longer felt inspired to write.

The earliest and most complete publication of Cereta's letters is the Tomasini edition, published in 1640, which nonetheless omits a dozen of her letters.

== Death ==
Laura Cereta died in 1499 between the ages of 29 and 30. Her cause of death is unknown. None of her writings from the later years of her life survived. She was honored with a public funeral and festivities in Brescia, which was uncommon for women. She is remembered as a great woman who laid out the groundwork for many feminist and humanist writers after the Renaissance.

== List of works ==
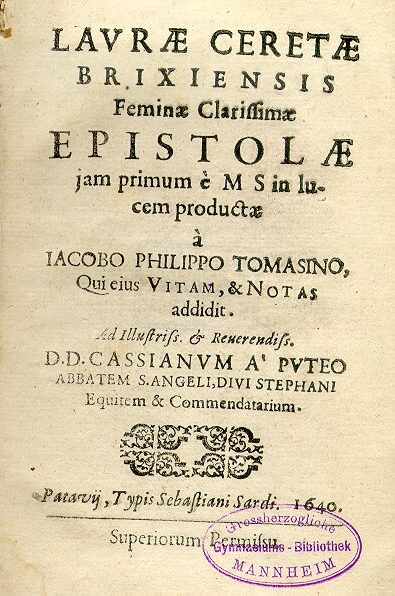
Laurae ceretae epistolae, Padua, 1640

- "Critical Edition of the Unpublished Materials in the Cereta Corpus." Edited by Albert Rabil, Jr. Laura Cereta: Quattrocento Humanist. Binghamton, N.Y.: Medieval and Renaissance Texts and Studies, 1981, 111-175.
- Laura Cereta: Collected Letters of a Renaissance Feminist. Transcribed, translated, and edited by Diana Robin. Chicago: University of Chicago Press, 1997.
- "Laura Cereta: Letter to Augustinus Aemilius, Curse against the Ornamentation of Women." Translated and edited by Margaret L. King and Albert Rabil, Jr. Her Immaculate Hand: Selected Works by and about the Women Humanists of Quattrocento Italy. Binghamton, N.Y.: Medieval and Renaissance Texts and Studies, 1983, 77-80.
- "Laura Cereta to Bibulus Sempronius: Defense of the Liberal Instruction of Women." Translated and edited by Margaret L. King and Albert Rabil, Jr. in Her Immaculate Hand: Selected Works by and about the Women Humanists of Quattrocento Italy. Binghamton, N.Y.: Medieval and Renaissance Texts and Studies, 1983, 81-84.

== Notes ==
- Cereta, Laura. "Letter to Augustinus Aemilius, Curse against the Ornamentation of Women" (PDF).
- McCue Gill, Amyrose (2009). "Fraught Relations in the Letters of Laura Cereta: Marriage, Friendship, and Humanist Epistolarity". Renaissance Quarterly. 62 (4): 1098–1129. doi:10.1086/650024. JSTOR 10.1086/650024. PMID 20099400.
- Julie, Kane. n.d. "Letter from Laura Cereta: Brescia, 1488." http://quod.lib.umich.edu/f/fs/0499697.0020.308/1#?/ (accessed October 24, 2014).
- King, M. L. (1 October 2005). "Petrarch, the Self-Conscious Self, and the First Women Humanists". Journal of Medieval and Early Modern Studies. 35 (3): 537–558. doi:10.1215/10829636-35-3-537.
- King, Margaret L., and Albert Rabil. 1983. Her immaculate hand: selected works by and about the women humanists of Quattrocento Italy. Binghamton, N.Y.: Center for Medieval & Early Renaissance Studies, 1983.
- Lonergan, Corinna Salvadori (1998). "Review of Dialogue on the Infinity of Love, (The Other Voice in Early Modern Europe); Collected Letters of a Renaissance Feminist, (The Other Voice in Early Modern Europe); The Worth of Women: Wherein is Clearly Revealed their Nobility and their Superiority to Men, (The Other Voice in Early Modern Europe)". Renaissance Studies. 12 (3): 435–439. JSTOR 24412619.
