= Demetrios Chalkokondyles =

Greek scholar (1423–1511)

Demetrios Chalkokondyles Δημήτριος Χαλκοκονδύλης
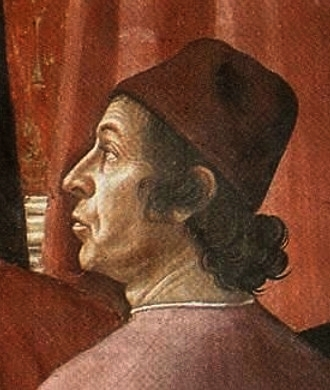
- Chalkokondyles, detail of Zachariah in the Temple by Domenico Ghirlandaio. Fresco. Santa Maria Novella, Cappella Tornabuoni, Florence, Italy. 1486–1490.
- Born: August 1423; Athens, Duchy of Athens
- Died: 9 January 1511 (aged 87); Milan, Duchy of Milan
- Occupations: Scholar, politician, diplomat, philosopher
- Relatives: Laonikos Chalkokondyles (cousin)
- Writing career
- Movement: Renaissance

Demetrios Chalkokondyles (Greek: Δημήτριος Χαλκοκονδύλης Dēmḗtrios Chalkokondýlēs), Latinized as Demetrius Chalcocondyles and found variously as Demetricocondyles, Chalcocondylas or Chalcondyles (1423 – 9 January 1511), was one of the most eminent Greek scholars in the West. He taught in Italy for over forty years; his colleagues included Marsilio Ficino, Poliziano, and Theodorus Gaza in the revival of letters in the Western world, and Chalkokondyles was the last of the Greek humanists who taught Greek literature at the great universities of the Italian Renaissance (Padua, Florence, Milan). One of his pupils at Florence was the famous Johann Reuchlin. Chalkokondyles published the first printed publications of Homer (in 1488), of Isocrates (in 1493), and of the Suda lexicon (in 1499).

== Life ==
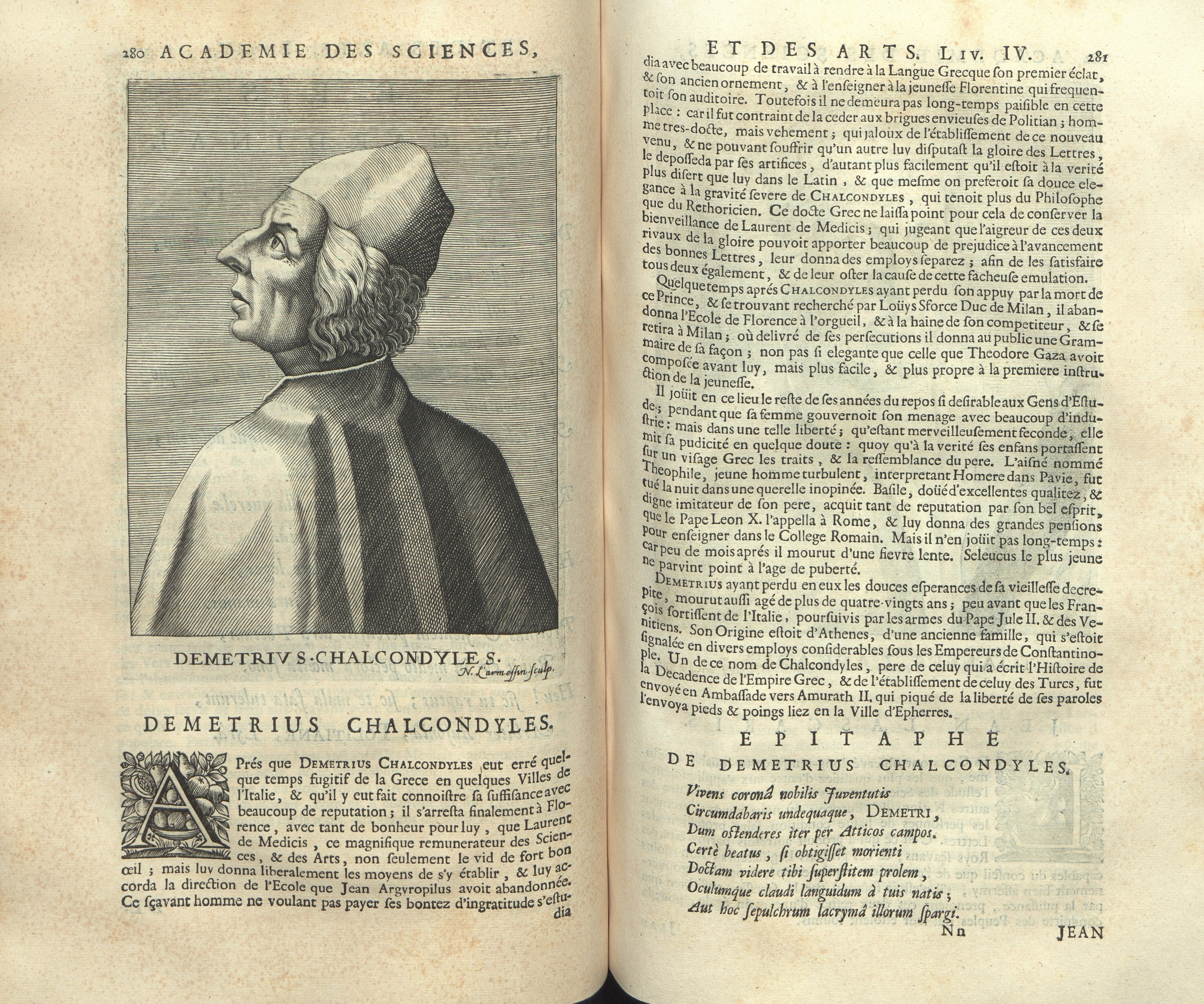
Demetrios Chalkokondyles at the Academie des sciences et des arts, 1682

Demetrios Chalkokondyles was born in the Duchy of Athens in 1423 to one of the noblest Athenian families; he was the cousin of Laonikos Chalkokondyles, the chronicler of the fall of Constantinople. He soon moved to the Peloponnese, with his Athenian family who had migrated after its persecution by the Florentine dukes. He migrated to Italy in 1447 and arrived at Rome in 1449 where Cardinal Bessarion became his patron. He became the student of Theodorus Gaza and later gained the patronage of Lorenzo de Medici, serving as a tutor to his sons. Afterwards Chalkokondyles lived the rest of his life in Italy, as a teacher of Greek and philosophy. One of Chalkokondyles' Italian pupils described his lectures at Perugia, where he taught in 1450:

A Greek has just arrived, who has begun to teach me with great pains, and I to listen to his precepts with incredible pleasure, because he is Greek, because he is an Athenian, and because he is Demetrius. It seems to me that in him is figured all the wisdom, the civility, and the elegance of those so famous and illustrious ancients. Merely seeing him you fancy you are looking on Plato; far more when you hear him speak.

Among his pupils were Janus Lascaris, Poliziano, Leo X, Castiglione, Giglio Gregorio Giraldi, Stefano Negri, and Giovanni Maria Cattaneo.

In 1463 Chalkokondyles was made professor at Padua, and later, at Francesco Philelpho's suggestion, in 1479 he took over the place of Ioannis Argyropoulos, as the head of the Greek Literature department and was summoned by Lorenzo de Medici to Florence. Chalkokondyles composed several orations and treatises calling for the liberation of his homeland Greece from what he called “the abominable, monstrous, and impious barbarian Turks.” In 1463 Chalkokondyles called on Venice and "all of the Latins" to aid the Greeks against the Ottomans, he identified this as an overdue debt and reminded the Latins how the Byzantine Greeks once came to Italy's aid against the Goths in the Gothic Wars (535–554 AD)

Just as she [Greece] had empended in their behalf [the Latins] all of her most precious and outstanding possessions liberally and without any parsimony, and had restored with her hand and force of arms the state of Italy, long ago oppressed by the Goths, they [the Latins] should in the same way now be willing to raise up prostrate and afflicted Greece and liberate it by arms from the hands of the barbarians.

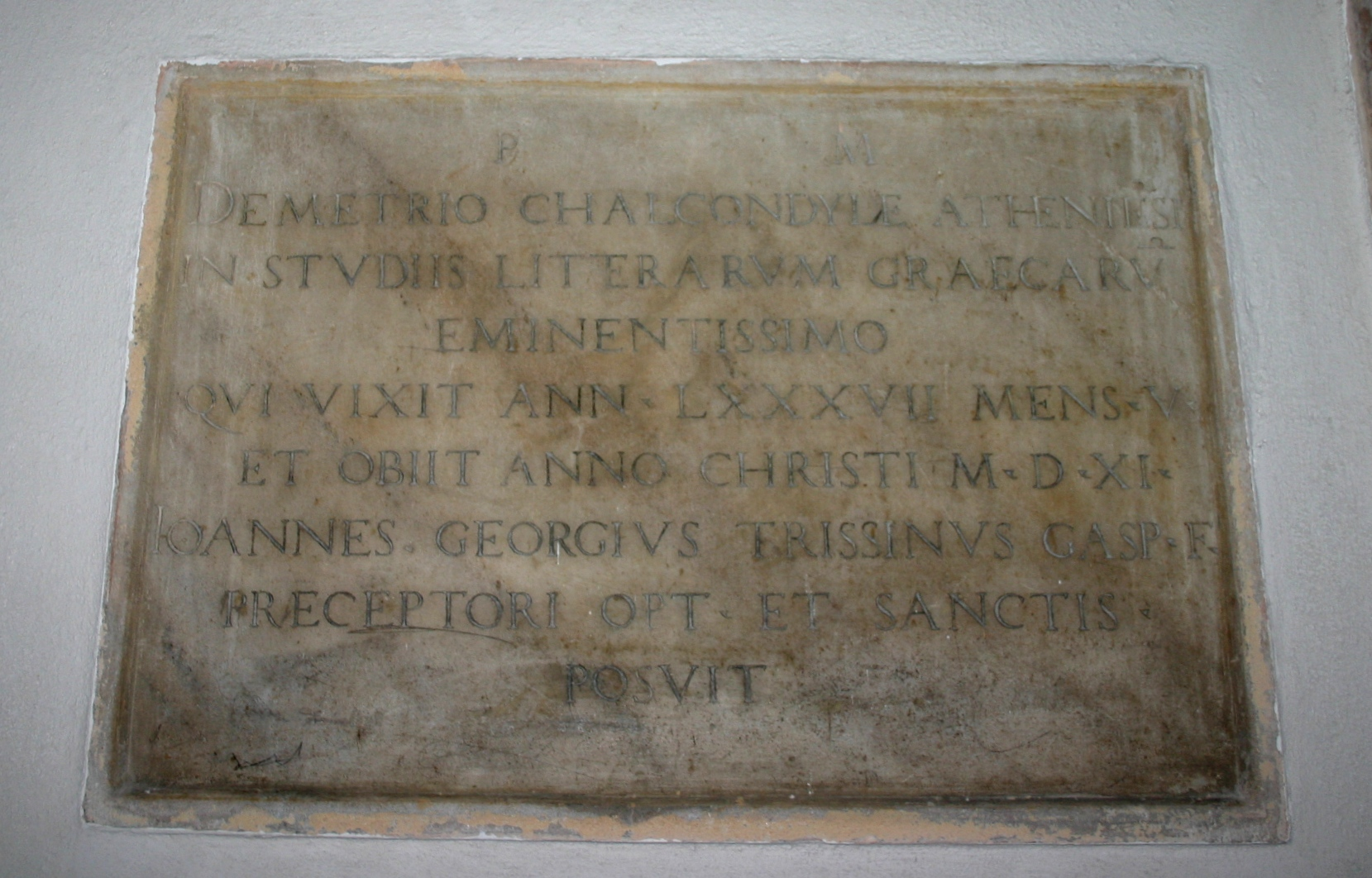
Gravestone in Milan.

It was during his tenure at the Studium in Florence that Chalkokondyles edited Homer for publication, which, dedicated to Lorenzo de' Medici, is his major accomplishment. He assisted Marsilio Ficino with his Latin translation of Plato. During his tenure at Florence, the German classical scholar Johannes Reuchlin was one of his pupils. He also taught Alessandra Scala, the Florentine Greek and Latin poet.

Chalkokondyles married in 1484 at the age of sixty-one and fathered ten children. Finally, invited by Ludovico Sforza, he moved to Milan (1491/1492), where he taught until he died.

== Works ==
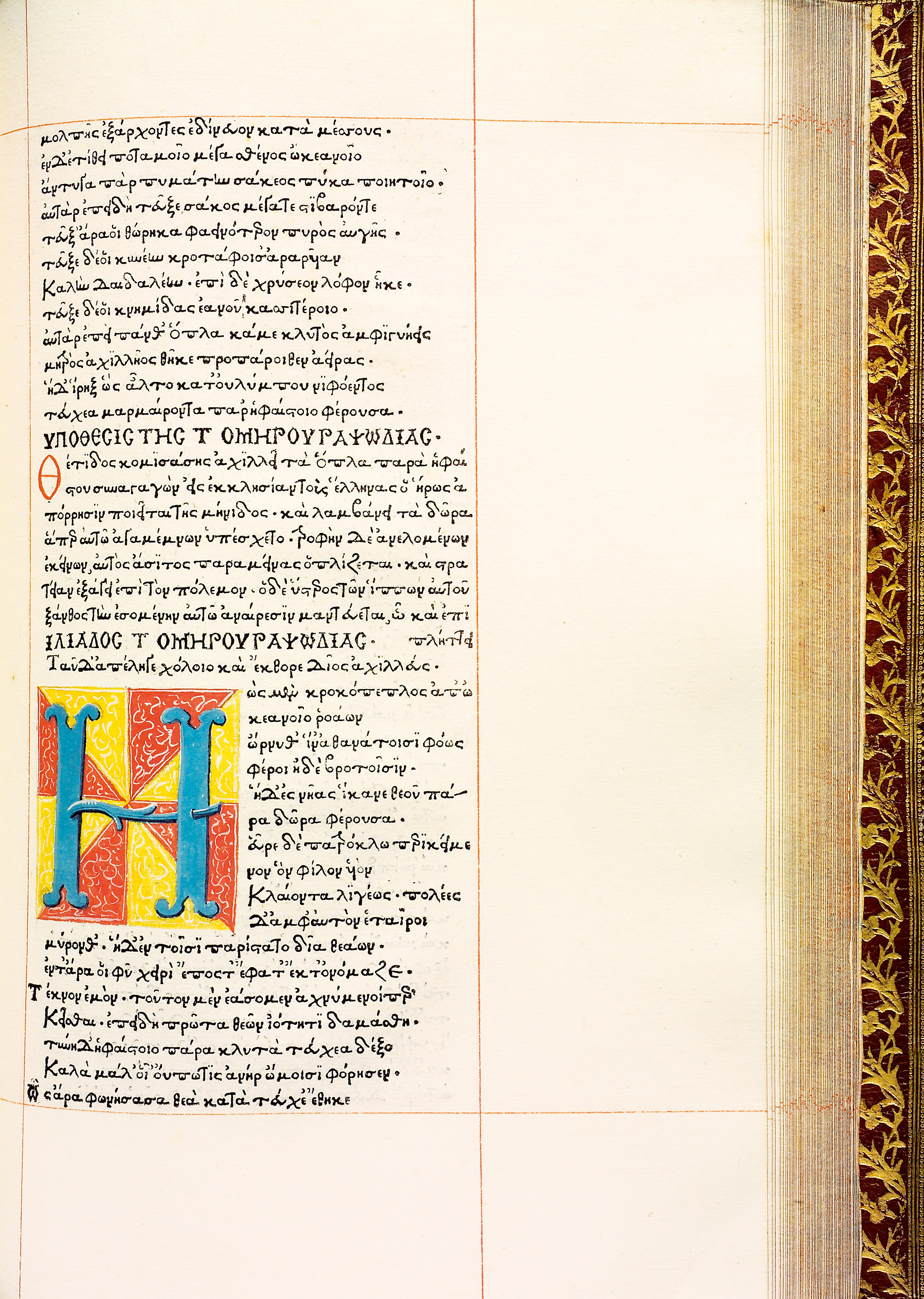
Page from the first printed edition (editio princeps) of collected works by Homer edited by Demetrios Chalkokondyles. Florence, 1489. Bibliothèque Nationale de France

He wrote in Ancient Greek the grammar handbook Summarized Questions on the Eight Parts of Speech with Some Rules (Ἐρωτήματα συνοπτικὰ τῶν ὀκτὼ τοῦ λόγου μερῶν μετὰ τινῶν κανόνων). He translated Galen's Anatomy into Latin.

As a scholar, Chalkokondyles published the editio princeps of Homer (Florence 1488), Isocrates (Milan 1493) and the Byzantine Suda lexicon (1499).

- Greek Grammar, edited 1546 by Melchior Volmar in Basel
- Latin translation of the Anatomical Procedures of Galen, edited and published in 1529 by Jacopo Berengario da Carpi
- Ἡ τοῦ Ὁμήρου ποίησις ἅπασα, 1488, editio princeps of Homer's Iliad and Odyssey, edited by Bernardus Nerlius and Chalkokondyles, appeared in Florence, not before 13 January 1489, in two folio volumes. It was the first Greek book to be printed in Florence. The Greek type used to print the 1488–1489 Homer is believed to have been cast by the Cretan Demetrius Damilas from the type that he had used to print Constantine Lascaris' Erotemata (Milan, 1476), the first book to be printed entirely in Greek, based upon the hand of Damilas's fellow scribe Michael Apostolis.

== See also ==
- Chalkokondyles family
- Greek scholars in the Renaissance

== General and cited references ==
- Bisaha, Nancy. Creating East and West: Renaissance Humanists and the Ottoman Turks, University of Pennsylvania Press, 2006, pp. 113–15. ISBN 978-0-8122-1976-0.
- Geanakoplos, Deno J. "The Discourse of Demetrius Chalcocondyles on the Inauguration of Greek Studies at the University of Padua", Studies in the Renaissance, 21 (1974), 118–44 and in Deno J. Geanakoplos, Interaction of the 'Sibling' Byzantine and Western Cultures in the Middle Ages and Italian Renaissance (330–1600), New Haven and London, 1976, pp. 296–304.
- Harris, Jonathan. Greek Émigrés in the West, 1400–1520, Camberley: Porphyrogenitus, 1995. ISBN 978-1-871328-11-0.
- Proctor, Robert. The Printing of Greek in the Fifteenth-Century, London, 1930, pp. 66–9.
- Vassileiou, Fotis, & Barbara Saribalidou. Short Biographical Lexicon of Byzantine Academics Immigrants to Western Europe, 2007.
- Wilson, N. G. From Byzantium to Italy: Greek Studies in the Italian Renaissance, London, 1992. ISBN 978-0-7156-2418-0.
