= Chalkokondyles family =

Greek noble family of Athens

The Chalkokondyles family or Chalcocondyles (Greek: Χαλκοκονδύλης), also seen as Chalkokandeles (Χαλκοκαντήλης) or Charchandeles (Χαρχαντήλης), was a Greek noble family of Athens which was elected during the Florentine possession of the city. The family can be traced back to the 11th century. The most important members of this family are:

- George (possibly 1390–1466). In 1435 he visited Sultan Murad II as an emissary of Maria Melissene, the widow of Antonio I Acciaioli, for his consent for the understanding, from himself and Maria, of his noble power in Athens. While he was away, however, their oppositions sent Maria and his family away from Athens and, when he returned, he was arrested and sent to the Sultan, who imprisoned him. He suffered the same fate upon another mission to the Sultan, which he undertook on behalf of the Despot of the Morea, Constantine Palaiologos.
  - Laonikos (Athens, before 1430 – possibly Italy, 1490), historian, son of George.
  - Demetrios (Athens, 1423 – Milan, 1511), scholar, nephew of George.
    - Theophilos (Florence, 1486–1510). Demetrios' son. He taught Greek Literature at the University of Pavia (see Pavia) when he was very young and he translated some works of Cicero. He was murdered by some of his rivals.

Much has been written about this family, especially about Laonikos, one of the most important historians of his time.

== See also ==
- Greek scholars in the Renaissance
