= Manto (poem) =

"Manto" is a didactic poem written in Latin in the 1480s by the Italian poet and humanist Poliziano. In it Poliziano pairs the goddesses of Revenge and Fate—Nemesis and Fortuna—to introduce the works of Virgil. Poliziano collected Manto with three other poems in his Silvae ("Woodlands") collection, a title he took from the Roman poet Statius. Poliziano used Manto along with the other poems in his Silvae as prologues to his classical courses which he taught in Florence; in 1516, they received a French edition.
