= Poliziano =

Italian classical scholar and poet (1454–1494)

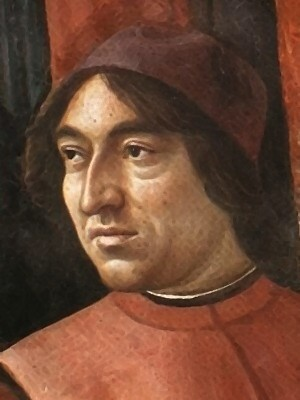
- Poliziano from a fresco painted by Renaissance artist Domenico Ghirlandaio in the Tornabuoni Chapel, Santa Maria Novella, Florence
- Born: Agnolo Ambrogini; 14 July 1454; Montepulciano, Republic of Florence
- Died: 24 September 1494 (aged 40); Florence, Republic of Florence
- Cause of death: Poisoning
- Occupations: Poet, dramatist and writer

Education
- Doctoral advisor: Marsilio Ficino; Cristoforo Landino

Philosophical work
- Notable students: Alessandra Scala, Cassandra Fedele, Piero II de' Medici

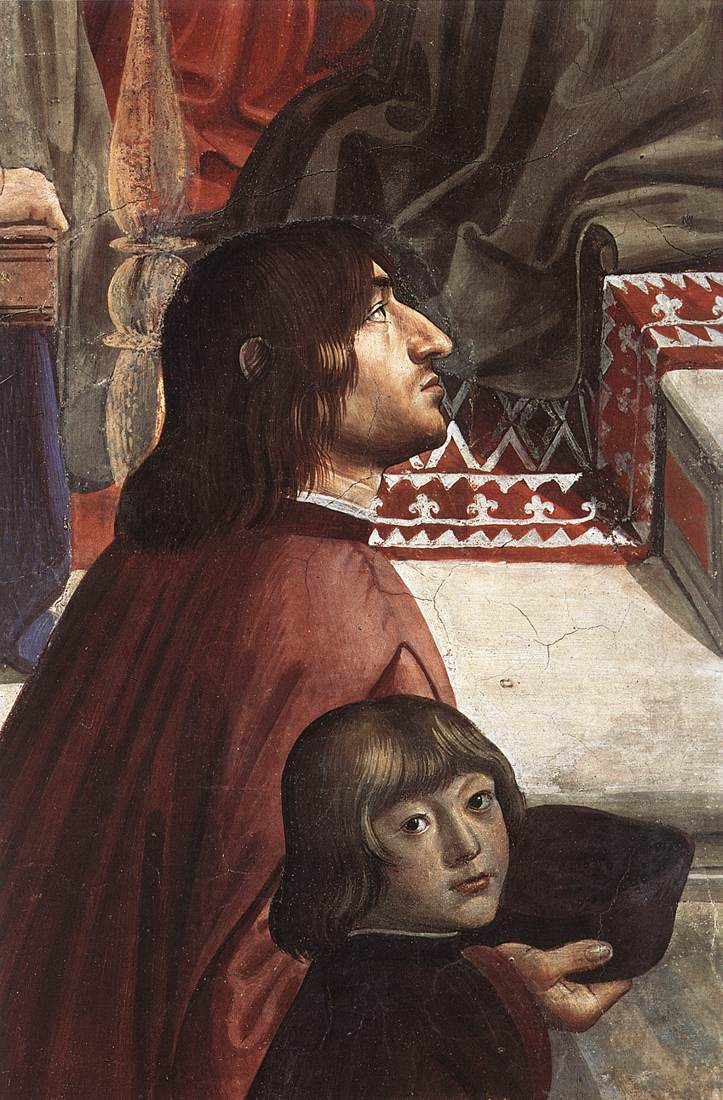
Poliziano and Giuliano de' Medici, from a fresco painted by Renaissance artist Domenico Ghirlandaio in the Sassetti Chapel, Santa Trinita, Florence

Agnolo (or Angelo) Ambrogini (Italian pronunciation: [ˈaɲɲolo ambroˈdʒiːni]; 14 July 1454 – 24 September 1494), commonly known as Angelo Poliziano (Italian: [ˈandʒelo politˈtsjaːno]) or simply Poliziano, anglicized as Politian, was an Italian classical scholar and poet of the Florentine Renaissance. His scholarship was instrumental in the divergence of Renaissance (or Humanist) Latin from medieval norms and for developments in philology. His nickname Poliziano, by which he is chiefly identified to the present day, was derived from the Latin name of his birthplace, Montepulciano (Mons Politianus).

Poliziano's works include translations of passages from Homer's Iliad, an edition of the poetry of Catullus and commentaries on classical authors and literature. It was his classical scholarship that brought him the attention of the wealthy and powerful Medici family that ruled Florence. He served the Medici as a tutor to their children, and later as a close friend and political confidant. His later poetry, including La Giostra, glorified his patrons.

He used his didactic poem Manto, written in the 1480s, as an introduction to his lectures on Virgil.

== Biography ==
=== Early life ===
Poliziano was born as Agnolo Ambrogini in Montepulciano, in central Tuscany in 1454. His father Benedetto, a jurist of good family and distinguished ability, was murdered by political antagonists for adopting the cause of Piero de' Medici in Montepulciano; this circumstance gave Agnolo, as his eldest son, a claim on the House of Medici.

At the age of ten, after the premature death of his father, Poliziano began his studies at Florence, as the guest of a cousin. There he learned the classical languages of Latin and Greek. From Marsilio Ficino he learned the rudiments of philosophy. At 13 he began to circulate Latin letters; at 17 he wrote essays in Greek versification; and at 18 he published an edition of Catullus. In 1470 he won the title of homericus adulescens by translating books II-V of the Iliad into Latin hexameters. Lorenzo de' Medici, the autocrat of Florence and the chief patron of learning in Italy at the time, took Poliziano into his household, made him the tutor of his children, among which were Piero the Unfortunate and Giovanni, the future Pope Leo X. The humanistic content of his lessons brought him into constant conflict with their mother, Clarice. Lorenzo also secured him a distinguished post at the University of Florence. During this time, Poliziano lectured at the Platonic Academy under the leadership of Marsilio Ficino, at the Careggi Villa.

=== Adulthood and teaching ===
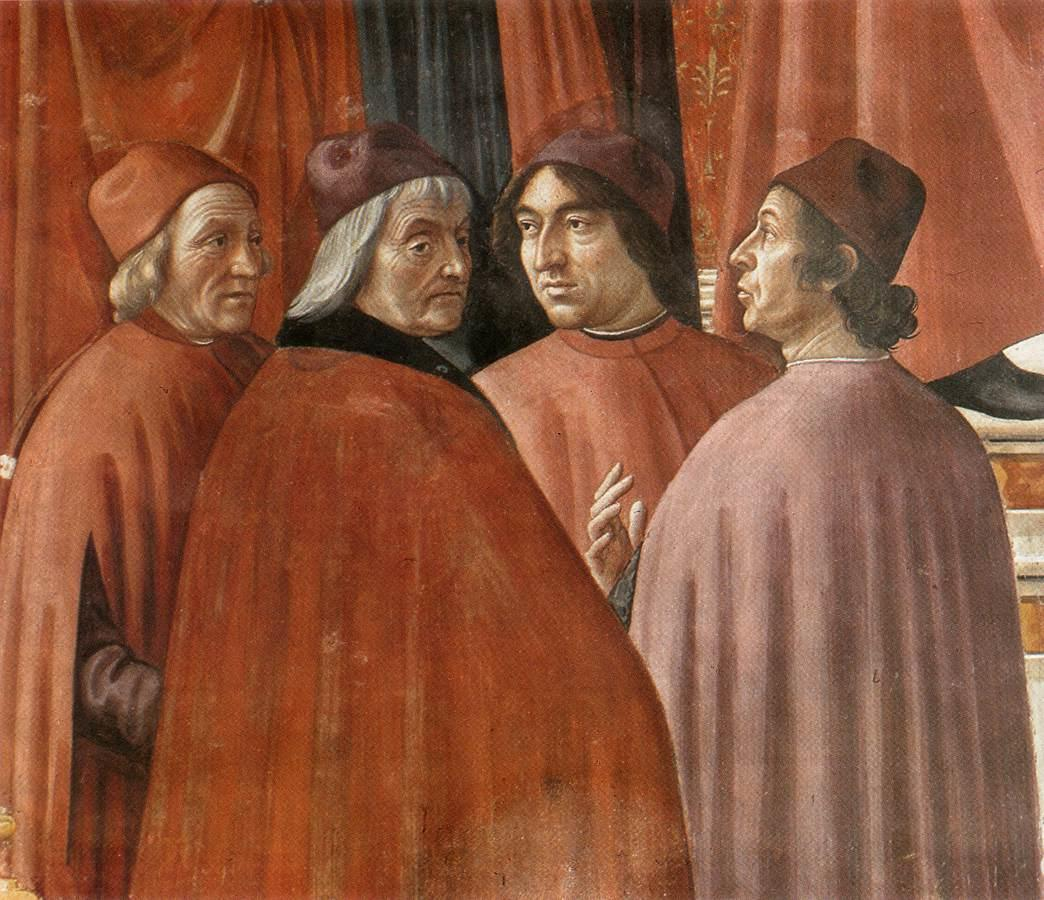
The annunciation of the angel to Zaccharia 1486–90. Marsilio Ficino (left), Cristoforo Landino (centre), Angelo Poliziano (third), and Demetrius Chalcondyles (far right)

Among Poliziano's pupils could be numbered the chief students of Europe, the men who were destined to carry to their homes the spolia opima of Italian culture. He also educated students from Germany, England and Portugal.

It was the method of professors at that period to read the Greek and Latin authors with their class, dictating philological and critical notes, emending corrupt passages in the received texts, offering elucidations of the matter, and teaching laws, manners, religious and philosophical opinions of the ancients. Poliziano covered nearly the whole ground of classical literature during his tenure, and published the notes of his courses upon Ovid, Suetonius, Statius, Pliny the Younger, and Quintilian. He also undertook a recension of the text of Justinian II's Digest and lectured about it. This recension influenced the Roman code.

=== Proposal to King John II of Portugal ===
Poliziano wrote a letter to John II of Portugal paying him a profound homage:

to render you thanks on behalf of all who belong to this century, which now favours of your quasi-divine merits, now boldly competing with ancient centuries and all Antiquity.

and considering his achievements to be of merit above Alexander the Great or Julius Caesar. He offered himself to write an epic work giving an account of John II's accomplishments in navigation and conquests. The king replied in a positive manner, in a letter of October 23, 1491, but delayed the commission. The epic work regarding Portuguese discoveries was only written almost one hundred years later by Luís de Camões.

=== Final years ===
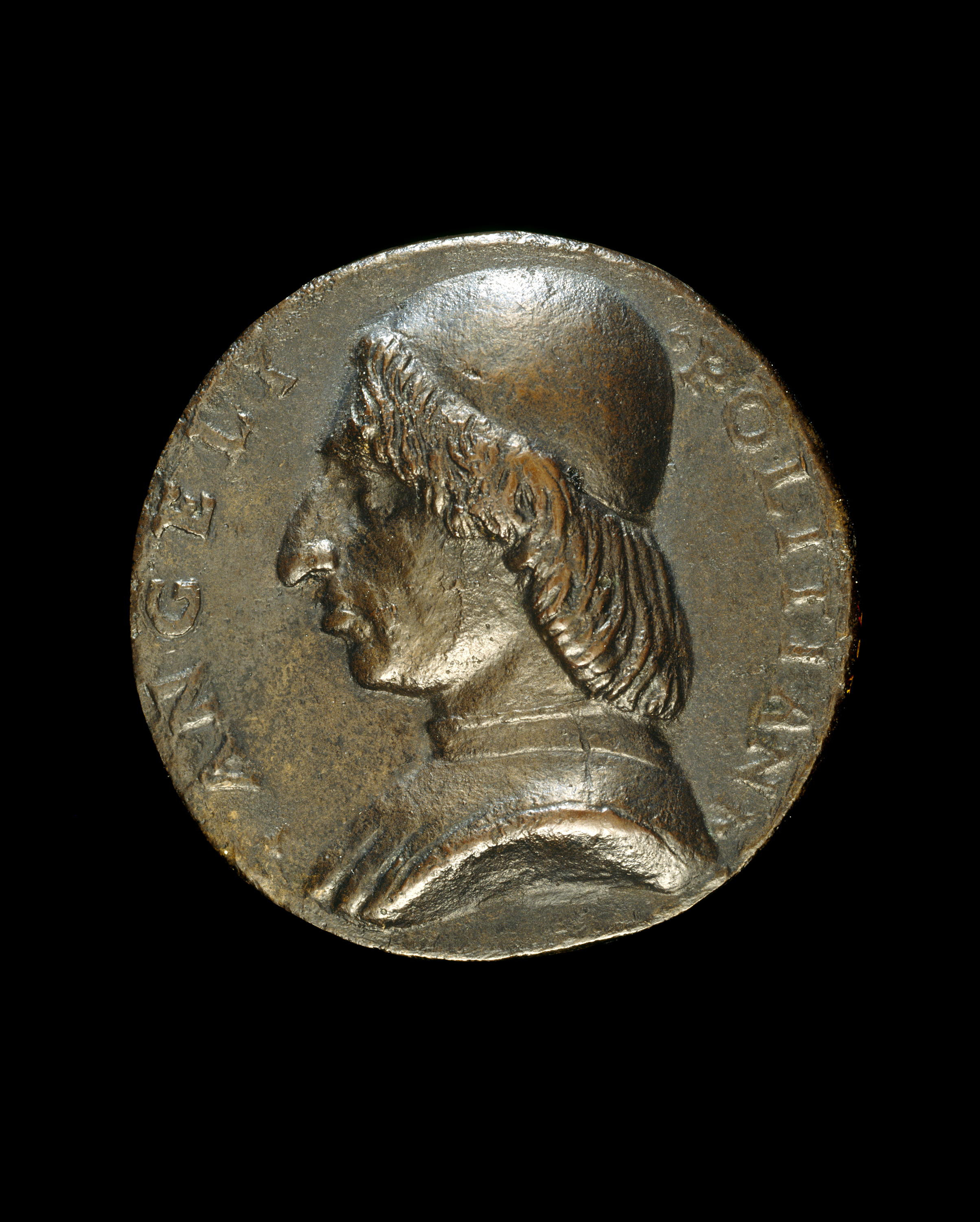
Style of Niccolò Fiorentino, Angelo Poliziano, 1454-1494, c. 1494, medallion in the National Gallery of Art

Poliziano spent his final years without financial or other worries, studying philosophy. Piero the Unfortunate even asked Pope Alexander VI to make him a cardinal.

It is likely that Poliziano was homosexual, or at least had male lovers, and he never married. This consensus is supported by denunciations of sodomy recorded by Florentine authorities, contemporary correspondence and verse, and homoerotic allusions within his literary works, most notably Orfeo. He may also have been a lover of Pico della Mirandola.

Prior to his exhumation in 2007, the circumstances of his death were also sometimes considered to be evidence of homosexuality: some evidence suggested that he was killed by a fever (possibly resulting from syphilis) which was exacerbated by standing under the windowsill of a boy he was infatuated with despite being ill. Others thought that his death was precipitated by the loss of his friend and patron Lorenzo de' Medici in April 1492, Poliziano himself dying on 24 September 1494, just before the foreign invasion gathering in France swept over Italy.

In 2007, the bodies of Poliziano and Pico della Mirandola were exhumed from the Church of San Marco in Florence to establish the causes of their deaths. Forensic tests showed that both Poliziano and Pico likely died of arsenic poisoning, possibly the order of Lorenzo's successor, Piero de' Medici.

== Legacy ==
Poliziano was well known as a scholar, a professor, a critic, and a Latin poet in an age when the classics were still studied with assimilative curiosity, and not with the scientific industry of a later period. He was the representative of that age of scholarship in which students drew their ideal of life from antiquity. He was also known as an Italian poet, a contemporary of Ariosto.

At the same time, he was busy as a translator from the Greek. His versions of Epictetus, Hippocrates, Galen, Plutarch's Eroticus and Plato's Charmides distinguished him as a writer. Of these learned labours, the most universally acceptable to the public of that time were a series of discursive essays on philology and criticism, first published in 1489 under the title of Miscellanea. They had an immediate and lasting effect, influencing the scholars of the next century.

Anthony Grafton writes that Poliziano's "conscious adoption of a new standard of accuracy and precision" enabled him "to prove that his scholarship was something new, something distinctly better than that of the previous generation":

By treating the study of antiquity as completely irrelevant to civic life and by suggesting that in any case only a tiny elite could study the ancient world with adequate rigor, Poliziano departed from the tradition of classical studies in Florence. Earlier Florentine humanists had studied the ancient world in order to become better men and citizens. Poliziano by contrast insisted above all on the need to understand the past in the light of every possibly relevant bit of evidence — and to scrap any belief about the past that did not rest on firm documentary foundations ... [But] when he set ancient works back into their historical context Poliziano eliminated whatever contemporary relevance they might have had.

== Works ==
His Latin and Greek works include:

- the poem Manto, in which he pronounced a panegyric of Virgil;
- the Ambra, which contains an idyllic sketch of Tuscan landscape and a eulogy of Homer;
- the Rusticus, which celebrated country life;
- the Nutricia, which was intended to serve as a general introduction to the study of ancient and modern poetry.

His principal Italian works are:

- his most highly regarded work in Italian, Stanze per la giostra, or La Giostra, written upon Giuliano de' Medici's victory in a tournament in 1475. This work was left unfinished following the 1478 Pazzi conspiracy, which resulted in the assassination of its protagonist. In addition, Lorenzo's wife Clarice strongly disapproved of the humanistic nature of the poem, causing Politian to resign, leave Florence in 1479 and settle in Mantua, where he set to work on the Fabula di Orfeo.
- the Orfeo, a lyrical drama performed at Mantua with musical accompaniment;
- a collection of Tuscan songs, reproducing various forms of popular poetry distinguished by a roseate fluency.

His philosophical works are:

- Praelectio de dialectica (1491), an introduction to Aristotelian logic;
- Lamia. Praelectio in Priora Aristotelis Analytica (1492);
- Dialectica (1493), an introduction to a course on Aristotelian philosophy.

=== English translations ===
- Poliziano, A. (1979). The Stanze of Angelo Poliziano. David Quint (ed. trans.). University of Massachusetts Press. ISBN 9780870231452.
- Poliziano, A. (2004). Silvae. C. Fantazzi (ed. trans.). Cambridge: Harvard University Press. ISBN 0-674-01480-4.
- Poliziano, A. (2006). Letters. S. Butler (ed. trans.). Cambridge: Harvard University Press. ISBN 0-674-02196-7.
- Poliziano, A. (2010). Angelo Poliziano's Lamia. C. S. Celenza (ed. trans.). Leiden: Brill. ISBN 978-90-04-18590-6.
