= Cassandra Fedele =

Italian humanist writer

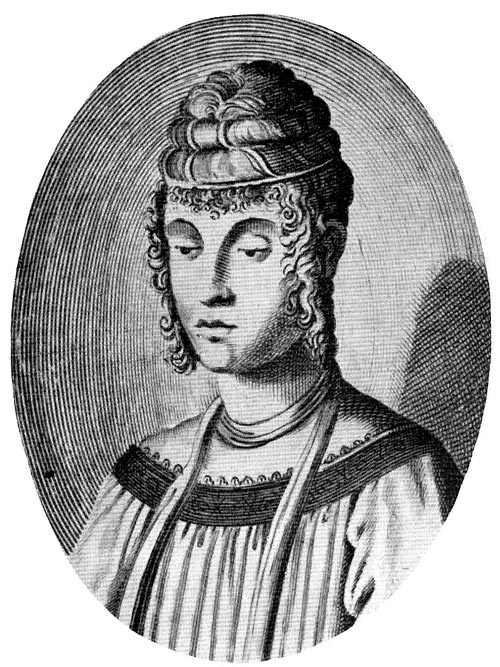
- A portrait of Cassandra Fedele
- Born: c. 1465; Venice, Italy
- Died: 1558; Venice, Italy

Cassandra Fedele (c. 1465 – 1558 CE) was an Italian humanist writer. She has been called the most renowned woman scholar in Italy during the last decades of the Quattrocento.

== Early life ==
Fedele was born in Venice in 1465 to Barbara Leoni and Angelo Fedele. While Fedele does not mention her mother in her writings, we have evidence that her father was respected among the aristocracy and took a great interest in his daughter's learning, however he himself seems not to have been employed in a particular trade. The Fedele family, who were citizens, rather than nobles, of Venice, had originally come from Milan.

When Fedele reached fluency in Greek and Latin at the age of twelve, she was sent by her father to Gasparino Borro, a Servite friar, who tutored her in classical literature, philosophy, the sciences, and dialectics. In 1487, at twenty-two years of age, she achieved success in Italy and abroad when she delivered a Latin speech in praise of the arts and sciences at her cousin's graduation at Padua. Her speech, Oratio pro Bertucio Lamberto, was published in Modena (1487), Venice (1488), and Nuremberg (1489). From 1487 to 1497, she exchanged letters with prominent humanists and nobles throughout Spain and Italy. One of these correspondents, Isabella I of Castile, urged Fedele to join her court in Spain. Fedele declined the invitation, writing that she could not go while Italy was at war with France. However, Fedele's early biographers believed that the doge Agostino Barbarigo would not allow Fedele to leave Italy, although there is no evidence of such a decree.

== Fame ==
Fedele achieved fame through her writing and oratorical abilities. In addition to the 123 letters and 3 orations published in Padua in 1636, it is believed that she also wrote Latin poetry. She participated with influential humanists in public debates on philosophical and theological issues and was asked to speak in front of the doge Agostino Barbarigo and the Venetian Senate on the subject of higher education for women. In a letter to Lorenzo de' Medici, Angelo Poliziano praised her for her excellence in both Latin and Italian and for her beauty.

== Later life ==
Fedele's success was short-lived. The climax of her scholarly activity occurred between the ages of twenty-two and thirty-three, just before her marriage at age thirty-four (1499). After she married, and for almost sixty years, she wrote few letters and was invited only once, in 1556, to deliver a public address in honour of the Queen of Poland, Bona Sforza, who came to Venice. Some historians argue that Fedele abandoned her intellectual pursuits when she got married, as was the case for most learned women of her day who married and assumed full-time management of an entire household. Fedele may have also been discouraged by strong social forces that opposed the scholarly participation of married women. In a letter to Alessandra Scala, who wrote Fedele asking whether she should get married or devote her life to study, Fedele encouraged her to "choose the path for which nature has suited you" (translation in Robin 31).

In 1520, on Fedele's return from Crete with her physician husband, Giammaria Mapelli, she lost all her belongings in a shipwreck. Her husband died later that year, leaving her a widow, childless, and in financial difficulty. Fedele wrote to Leone X asking for help in 1521, but he did not reply to her letter. She tried again in 1547 and wrote to Paolo III, who responded by giving her a position as the prioress of an orphanage at the church of San Domenico di Castello in Venice, where she resided until her death. Fedele may have also struggled with health problems. Before her marriage, she complained of an illness that was depleting her strength and making it difficult to concentrate on reading and writing for any length of time.

== Works ==
- "Cassandra Fedele: (a) Alessandra Scala to Cassandra; (b) Cassandra to Alessandra." Translated and edited by Margaret L. King and Albert Rabil, Jr. Her Immaculate Hand: Selected Works by and about the Women Humanists of Quattrocento Italy. Binghamton, N.Y.: Medieval and Renaissance Texts and Studies, 1983, 87-88.
- Cassandra Fedele: Letters and Orations. Edited and translated by Diana Robin. Chicago: University of Chicago Press, 2000.
- "Cassandra Fedele: Oration for Bertucio Lamberto, Receiving the Honors of the Liberal Arts." Translated and edited by Margaret L. King and Albert Rabil, Jr.
- Her Immaculate Hand: Selected Works by and about the Women Humanists of Quattrocento Italy. Binghamton, N.Y.: Medieval and Renaissance Texts and Studies, 1983, 69-73.
- "Cassandra Fedele: Oration in praise of letters." Translated and edited by Margaret L. King and Albert Rabil, Jr. Her Immaculate Hand: Selected Works by and about the Women Humanists of Quattrocento Italy. Binghamton, N.Y.: Medieval and Renaissance Texts and Studies, 1983, 74-77.
- "Cassandra Fedele: Oration to the Ruler of Venice, Francesco Venerio, on the arrival of the Queen of Poland." Translated and edited by Margaret L. King and Albert Rabil, Jr. Her Immaculate Hand: Selected Works by and about the Women Humanists of Quattrocento Italy. Binghamton, N.Y.: Medieval and Renaissance Texts and Studies, 1983, 48-50.
- Giacomo Filippo Tomasini, ed. (1636). Clarissimae Feminae Cassandrae Fidelis venetae. Epistolae et orationes. Padua: Franciscus Bolzetta.
- Oratio pro Bertucio Lamberto. Modena, 1487; Venice, 1488; Nuremberg, 1489.

== See also ==
- List of women in the Heritage Floor (Cassandra Fidelis)

== Sources ==
- Archivio biografico italiano (microform). Edited by Tommaso Nappo. Munich and New York: Saur, 1987-98.
- Cavazzano, Cesira. Cassandra Fedele: erudita veneziana del Rinascimento Venezia: Tip. Orfanotrofio di A. Pellizzato, 1907.
- Dizionario enciclopedico della letteratura italiana, vol. II. Bari: LaTerza; Roma: Unione Editoriale, 1966, p. 433.
- King, Margaret L. "Book-Lined Cells: Women and Humanism in the Early Italian Renaissance." Beyond Their Sex: Learned Women of the European Past. New York: New York University Press, 1980, pp. 66–90.
- King, Margaret L. "Thwarted ambitions: Six Learned Women of the Italian Renaissance." Soundings: An Interdisciplinary Journal 59, no. 3 (Fall 1976): 280-304.
- King, Margaret L. Women of the Renaissance. Chicago: University of Chicago Press, 1991.
- Panizza, Letizia and Sharon Wood, editors. A History of Women's Writing in Italy. Cambridge: Cambridge University Press, 2000.
- Petrettini, Maria. Vita di Cassandra Fedele veneziana. Venezia: Tip. di Giuseppe Grimaldo, 1852.
- Pignatti, F. "Fedele (Fedeli), Cassandra." Enciclopedia italiana. Roma: Societˆ Grafica, 1979, pp. 566–68.
- Robin, Diana. "Cassandra Fedele (1465-1558)." Italian Women Writers: A Bio-Bibliographical Sourcebook. Edited by Rinaldina Russell. Westport, Connecticut and London: Greenwood Press, 1994, pp. 119–27.
- Robin, Diana. "Cassandra Fedele's Epistolae (1488-1521): Biography as Ef-facement." The Rhetorics of Life-Writing in Early Modern Europe: Forms of Biography from Cassandra Fedele to Louis XIV. Edited by Thomas Mayer and Daniel Woolf. Ann Arbor, Mich.: University of Michigan Press, 1995, pp. 187–203.
- Schlam, Carl C. "Cassandra Fidelis as a Latin Orator." Acta Conventus Neo-Latini Sanctandreani: Proceedings of the Fifth International Congress of Neo-Latin Studies (St. Andrews 24 August to 1 September 1982). Binghamton, N.Y.: Medieval and Renaissance Texts and Studies, 1986, pp. 185–91
