= Giacomo Filippo Tomasini =

Italian historian (1595–1655)

Most Reverend Giacomo Filippo Tomasini
- Bishop of Novigrad
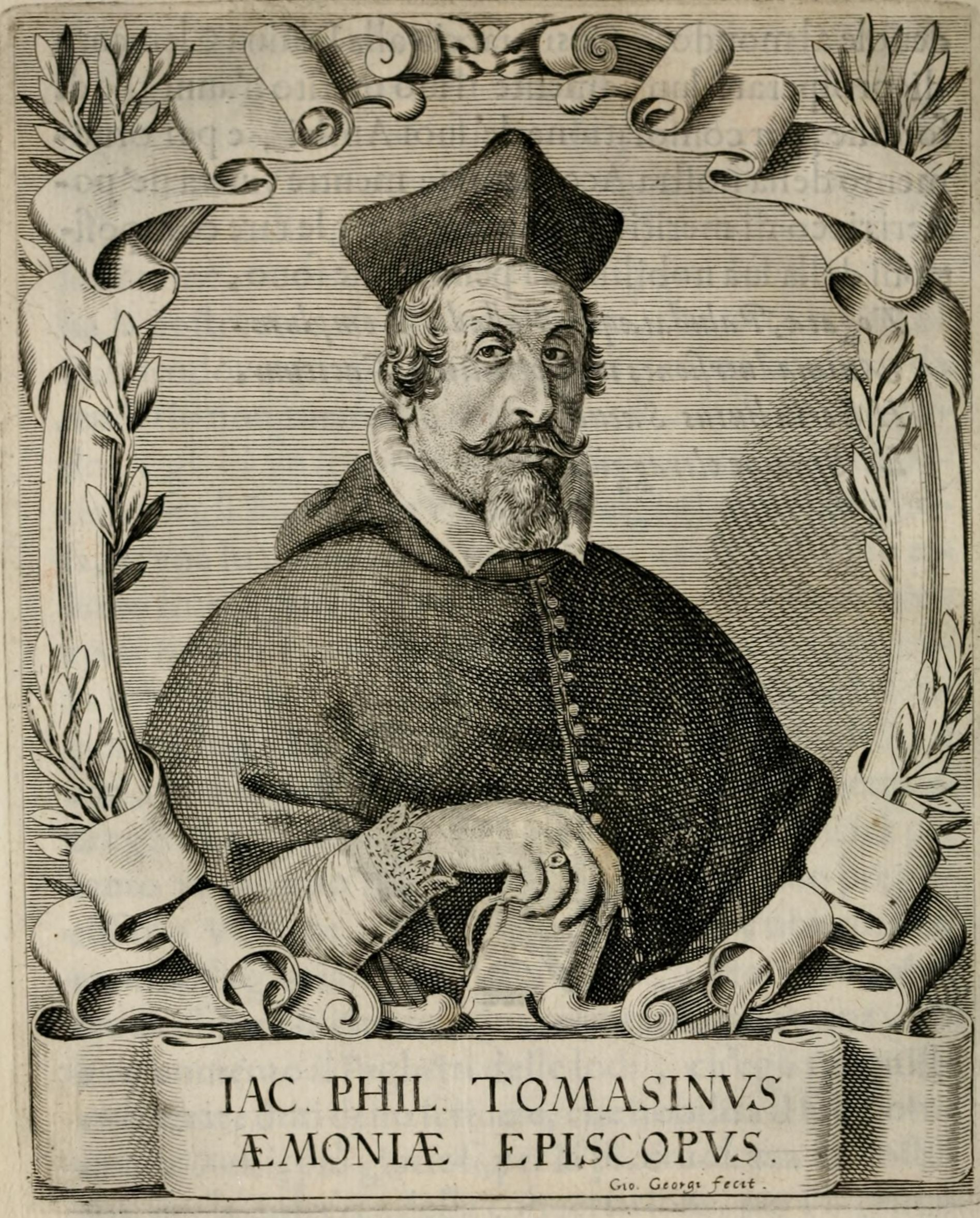
- Giacomo Filippo Tomasini. From the book "Le glorie degli Incogniti", 1647
- Church: Catholic Church
- Diocese: Diocese of Novigrad
- Appointed: 16 June 1642
- Term ended: 13 June 1655

Orders
- Consecration: 16 June 1642 (Bishop) by Marcantonio Bragadin

Personal details
- Born: 17 November 1595 Padua, Republic of Venice
- Died: 13 June 1655 (aged 59) Novigrad, Republic of Venice
- Education: University of Padua

Giacomo Filippo Tomasini (17 November 1595 – 13 June 1655) was an Italian Catholic bishop, scholar and historian.

== Biography ==
Giacomo Filippo Tomasini was born at Padua, Nov. 17, 1595. Instructed by Benedetto Benedetti of Legnano, he joined the Venetian order of secular Canons Regular of San Giorgio in Alga when he was fourteen, and received the degree of doctor at Padua in 1619.

He went to Rome, where he was cordially received, especially by Pope Urban VIII, who would have appointed him to a bishopric in the island of Candia. At his own request, this was exchanged for the see of Cittanova d'Istria, to which he was consecrated in 1642. There he remained until his death, in 1654.

Tomasini was a close friend and main collaborator of the Greek scholar Leone Allacci. Their correspondence indicates that they had started exchanging scholarly materials in the early 1630s, and rapidly became on very good terms. For the next twenty years, Tomasini acted as Allacci's main contact with antiquarian circles in Padua and Venice. Allacci sent Tomasini information about Petrarch manuscripts in the Vatican for the Petrarcha redivivus which appeared in 1635.

In 1644 Tomasini saw through the presses the Romanae aedificationes, the work Allacci had compiled many years earlier about his first patron Lelio Biscia's administration of public works in Rome under Pope Paul V.

== Works ==
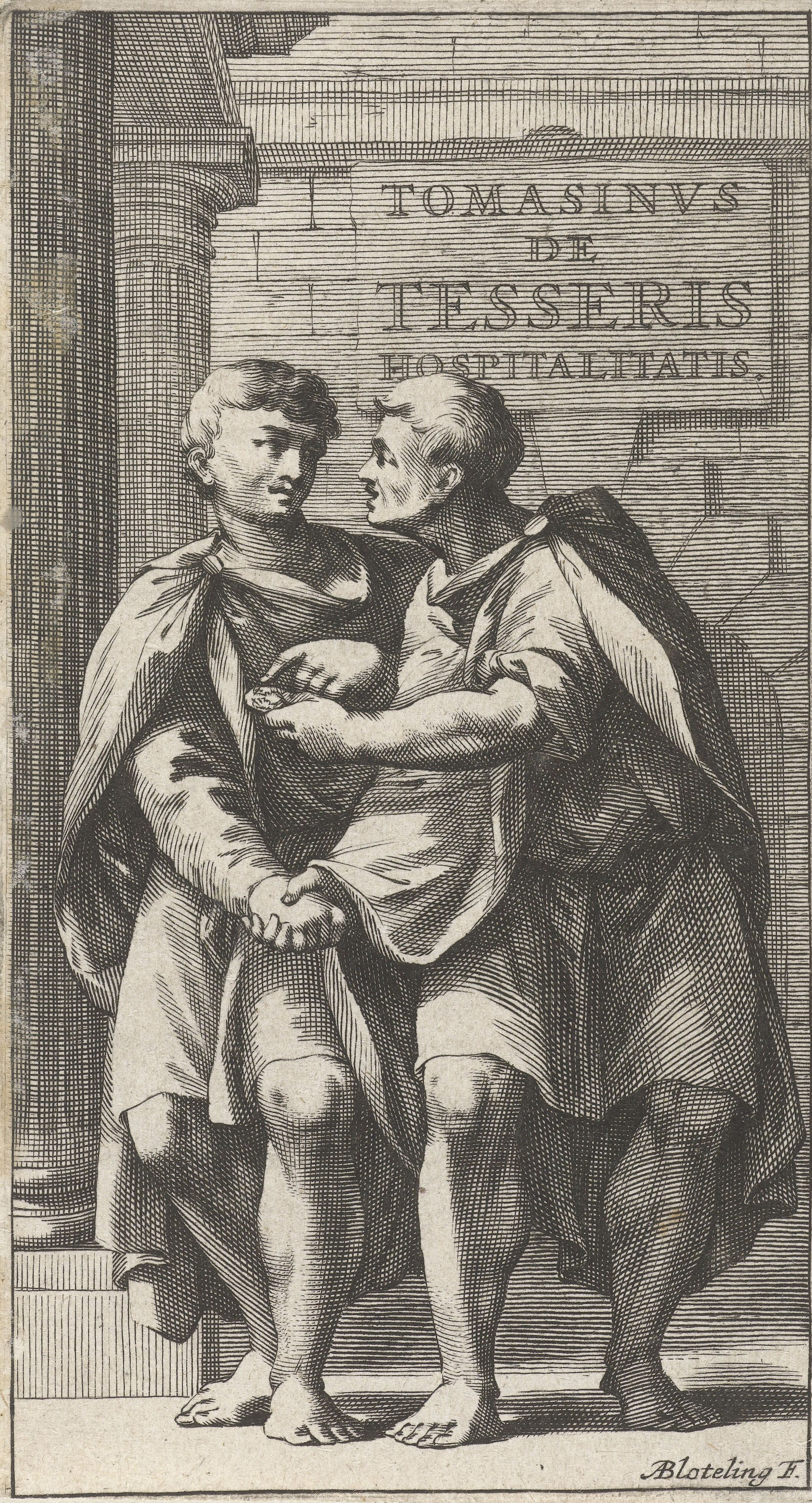
Giacomo Filippo Tomasini, De tesseris hospitalitatis liber singularis, in quo jus hospitii universum, apud veteres potissimum, expenditur. Amsterdam, sumpt. A. Frisii, 1670.

A prolific scholar, Tomasini is especially known for his critical editions of the letters of Cassandra Fedele (1636) and Laura Cereta (1640), and for several works on archaeology, most notably his De Donariis ac Tabellis Votivis, a learned work on the votive offerings of the ancients.

His works include:

- Illustrium Virorum Elogia Iconibus Exornata (Padua, 1630, 4º; 2nd vol. 1644)
- Titus Livius Patavinus (ibid. 1630, 4º; Titi Livii Historiarum libri, ed. Arnold Drakenborch, v. 7, 1746, p. 4; v. 15, pt. 1, 1828, p. 8)
- Manus aeneae, Cecropii votum referentis, dilucidatio (Padua, 1649, 4º; Jakob Gronovius, Thes. Gr. antiq. v. 10, p. 657)
- De Donariis ac Tabellis Votivis, etc. (Utin. 1639, 4º; Johann Georg Graevius, Thes. antiq. Rom. v. 12, p. 737)
- Vita, bibliotheca, et museum Laurentii Pignorii (Venice, 1632, 4º; Graevius, Thes. antiq. Ital. v. 6, pt. 3)
- De tesseris hospitalitatis, (Padua, 1647, 4º; Gronovius, Thes. Gr. antiq. v. 9, p. 213)
- Petrarcha Redivivus Integram Poetae Celeberrimi Vitam Iconibus Ære Celatis Exhibens (ibid. 1635, 4º)
- Clarissimae feminae Cassandrae Fidelis Venetae Epistolae et Orationes Posthumae. Padua: Francesco Bolzetta. 1636.
- Laurae Ceretae Epistolae, cum Notis etc. Padua: Sebastiano Sardi. 1640.
- Bibliothecae Patavinae Manuscripta, etc. (ibid. 1639, 4º)
- Bibliothecae Venetae Manuscripta, etc. (Utin. 1650, 4º).
- Vita della B. Beatrice della famiglia de prencipi d'Este il di cui corpo da quattrocento, e settanta due anni in circa intiero ancora si conserua nella chiesa interiore del venerando Monasterio di S. Sofia nella città di Padoua già descritta da monsig. Giacomo Filippo Tomasini, et hora nouamente ristampata ad istanza della reuerendissima madre abbadessa suor Quieta Ottata nobile padouana, et di tutte le madri del sudetto monasterio, et dalla medeme dedicata all'eminentissimo, Gregorio cardinale Barbarigo, In Udine : per Nicolo Schiratti, 1652
