= Bartolomeo Scala =

Italian politician, author and historian

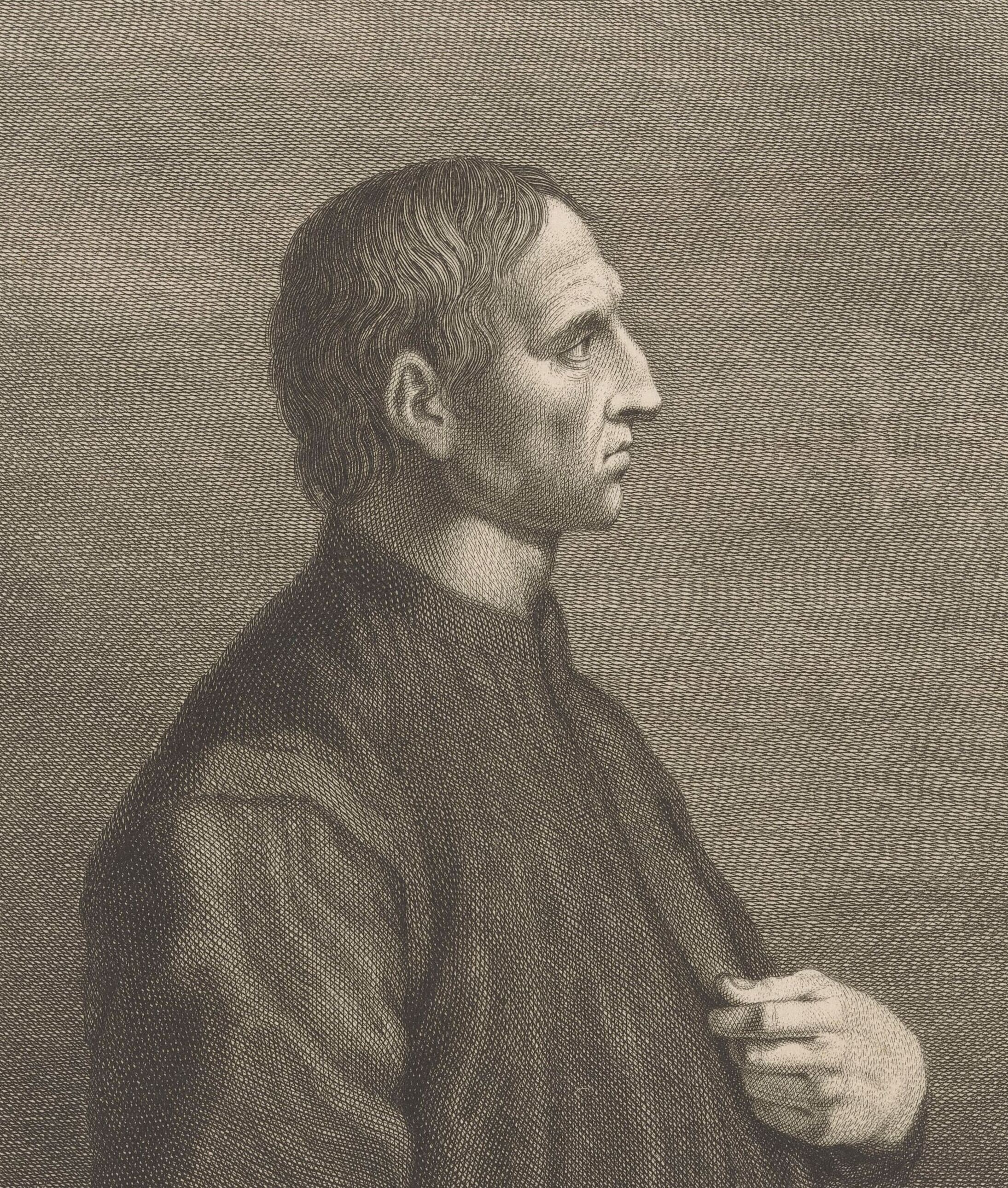
Bartolommeo Scala (1430-1497)

Bartolomeo Scala (1430–1497) was an Italian politician, author and historian. Born in Colle di Val d'Elsa, he became a protégé of Cosimo and Piero de' Medici, being appointed at the highest positions in the Florentine Republic (Chancellor, Secretary, Gonfaloniere and Priore).

He wrote an unfinished History of Florence, as well as various essays and dialogues. He was a member of the Accademia Neoplatonica. Scala died in 1497, and was buried in a chapel of Annunziata.

== Bibliography ==
- Alison Brown, Bartolomeo Scala, 1430-1497, Chancellor of Florence: The Humanist As Bureaucrat, Princeton, 1979.
- G.C. Garfagnini "Tra politica, clientele e senso dello stato: Bartolomeo Scala", Annali del Dipartimento di Filosofia (Nuova Serie), XV (2009), pp. 109–130. Available online with an English summary.
- G.C. Garfagnini "Bartolomeo Scala e la difesa dello stato «nuovo»" in Humanistica, "Per Cesare Vasoli", Olschki, Firenze 2003, pp. 71–86. Available online.
