= Christianity in the 5th century =

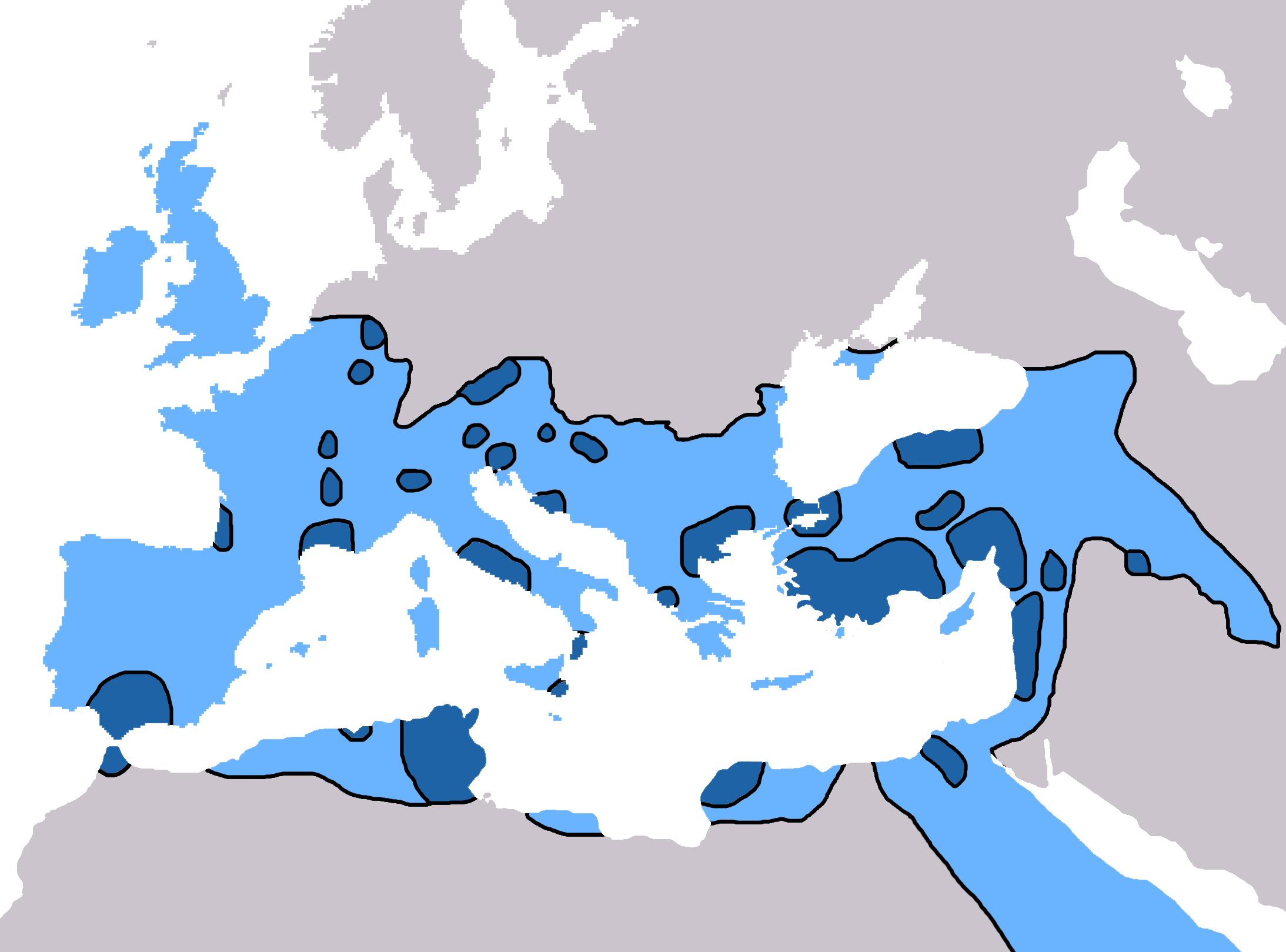
Spread of Christianity to AD 325 Spread of Christianity to AD 600

In the 5th century in Christianity, there were many developments which led to further fracturing of the State church of the Roman Empire. Emperor Theodosius II called two synods in Ephesus, one in 431 and one in 449, that addressed the teachings of Patriarch of Constantinople Nestorius and similar teachings. Nestorius had taught that Christ's divine and human nature were distinct persons, and hence Mary was the mother of Christ but not the mother of God. The Council rejected Nestorius' view causing many churches, centered on the School of Edessa, to a Nestorian break with the imperial church. Persecuted within the Roman Empire, many Nestorians fled to Persia and joined the Sassanid Church. By the end of the 5th century, the global Christian population was estimated at 10-11 million. In 451 the Council of Chalcedon was held to clarify the issue further. The council ultimately stated that Christ's divine and human nature were separate but both part of a single entity, a viewpoint rejected by many churches who called themselves miaphysites. The resulting schism created a communion of churches, including the Armenian, Syrian, and Egyptian churches, that is today known as Oriental Orthodoxy. In spite of these schisms, however, the imperial church still came to represent the majority of Christians within the Roman Empire.

At the end of the 4th century the Roman Empire had effectively split into two states although its economy and the Church were still strongly tied. The two halves of the empire had always had cultural differences, in particular exemplified by the widespread use of the Greek language in the Eastern Empire and the more limited use of Greek in the West (Greek was used in the West but Latin was displacing it as the spoken vernacular. By the 5th century scholars in the West had begun to abandon Greek in favor of the use of Latin. The Church in Rome, in particular, began to encourage the use of Latin in the western provinces and published Jerome's Vulgate, the first authorized translation of the Bible in Latin.

At the same time as these changes were taking place the Western Empire was beginning to decay rapidly. Germanic tribes, particularly the Goths, gradually conquered the western provinces. The Arian Germanic tribes established their own systems of churches and bishops in the western provinces but were generally tolerant of those who chose to remain loyal to the imperial church.

== Ecumenical councils ==
The Council of Ephesus in 431 and the Council of Chalcedon in 451 led to the schism with Church of the East and the schism with the Miaphysite churches. The latter schism established what is today known as Oriental Orthodoxy.

=== First Council of Ephesus ===
Theodosius II called a council to settle the Nestorian controversy. Nestorius, Patriarch of Constantinople, opposed use of the term Theotokos (Greek Η Θεοτόκος, "God-bearer"). This term had long been used by orthodox writers, and it was gaining popularity along with devotion to Mary as Mother of God. He reportedly taught that there were two separate persons in the incarnate Christ, though whether he actually taught this is disputed. Cyril of Alexandria charged that this teaching of Nestorius implied that there had been in fact two Jesus Christs; one Christ was a man born of the virgin Mary and the other was divine and not born but also Jesus Christ.

Cyril of Alexandria regarded the embodiment of God in the person of Jesus Christ to be so mystically powerful that it spread out from the body of the God-man into the rest of the race, to reconstitute human nature into a graced and deified condition of the saints (Jesus Christ as the new Adam), one that promised immortality and transfiguration to believers. Nestorius, on the other hand, saw the incarnation as primarily a moral and ethical example to the faithful, to follow in the footsteps of Jesus. Cyril repeatedly stressed the simple idea that it was God who walked the streets of Nazareth (hence Mary was Theotokos or Mother of God), and God who had appeared in a transfigured humanity (see the theophany). Nestorius spoke of the distinct 'Jesus the Man' and 'the divine Logos' in ways that Cyril thought were too dichotomous, widening the ontological gap between man and God in a way that would annihilate the person (hypostasis) of Christ a position termed dyophysite.

The council deposed Nestorius, repudiated Nestorianism, proclaiming the Virgin Mary as the Theotokos.

After quoting the Nicene Creed in its original form, as at the First Council of Nicaea, without the alterations and additions made at the First Council of Constantinople, it declared it "unlawful for any man to bring forward, or to write, or to compose a different (ἑτέραν) Faith as a rival to that established by the holy Fathers assembled with the Holy Ghost in Nicæa."

=== Council of Chalcedon ===
The Council of Chalcedon took place from October 8 to November 1, 451, at Chalcedon (a city of Bithynia in Asia Minor). It was the fourth of the first seven Ecumenical Councils and is therefore recognized as infallible in its dogmatic definitions by the Roman Catholic and Eastern Orthodox churches. Chalcedon was called to address concerns first raised in November 448, at a synod at Constantinople, which condemned Eutyches for unorthodoxy. An archimandrite of a large Constinapolitan monastery, Eutyches taught a Christological position at the opposite extreme from that of Nestorius, namely that Christ was not consubstantial with humanity. In order to settle the issue, the Second Council of Ephesus was held in 449, at which Eutyches was exonerated and returned to his monastery. Although intended to be an ecumenical council, this council was not called with enough notice for the Western bishops to attend, and was subsequently labeled a "robber council" by the Council of Chalcedon.

The Council of Chalcedon repudiated Eutyches and his doctrine of monophysitism, described and delineated the "Hypostatic Union" and two natures of Christ, human and divine. It also adopted the Chalcedonian Creed, which describes the "full humanity and full divinity" of Jesus, the second person of the Holy Trinity.

== Schism in the East ==
=== Nestorianism ===
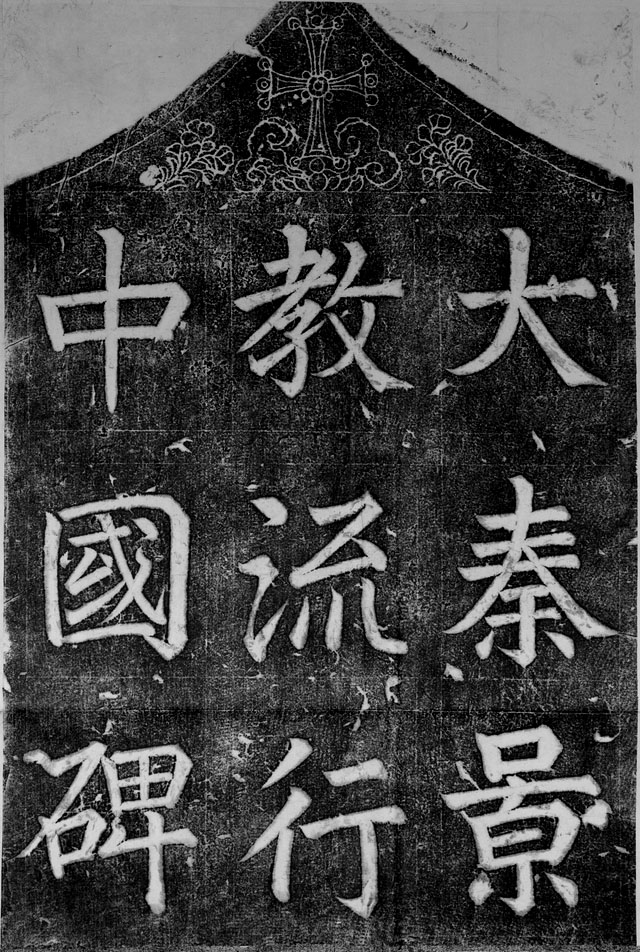
Detail of the Nestorian stele

Nestorian churches are Eastern Christian churches that keep the faith of only the first two ecumenical councils, i.e., the First Council of Nicaea and the First Council of Constantinople. "Nestorian" is an outsider's term for a tradition that predated the influence of Nestorius. Thus, "Assyrian Church of the East" is a more neutral term. The Nestorian Schism was the first major schism of the Eastern Churches and was addressed with the Council of Ephesus.

=== Oriental Orthodoxy ===
The Coptic Cross

Eastern Orthodoxy strives to keep the faith of the seven Ecumenical Councils. In contrast, the term "Oriental Orthodoxy" refers to the churches of Eastern Christian traditions that keep the faith of only the first three ecumenical councils — the First Council of Nicaea, the First Council of Constantinople and the Council of Ephesus — and rejected the dogmatic definitions of the Council of Chalcedon. It is sometimes called the Greek Orthodox to distinguish it from the Coptic Orthodox Patriarchate of Alexandria. In Egypt, members of the Greek Orthodox Patriarchate were also called Melkite, because they remained in communion with the Patriarch of Constantinople.

Oriental Orthodox is also sometimes referred to as "monophysites", "non-Chalcedonians", or "anti-Chalcedonians", although today the Oriental Orthodox Churches denies that it is monophysite and prefers the term "miaphysite" to denote the "joined" nature of Jesus. The dogma chosen by the Oriental Orthodox was interpreted to express that Jesus Christ had two natures (both human and divine) that were unified hypostatically into a one single nature. This was interpreted from the Byzantine position to be an argument that greatly diminished the human reality of Christ, by also making the human will of Christ one not of freewill.

Those who disagreed with the findings of the Council of Chalcedon are today known as the Coptic Orthodox Church of Alexandria. This included the Ethiopian Orthodox Tewahedo Church and the Armenian Orthodox church. There was a similar split in Syria (Patriarchate of Antioch) into the Greek Orthodox Church of Antioch and the Syriac Orthodox Church.

== Post-Nicene Fathers ==
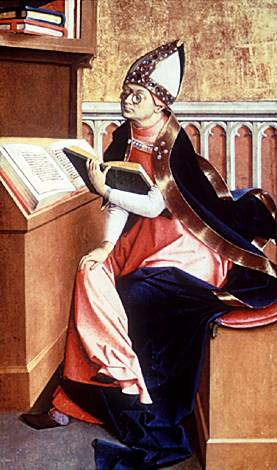
Augustine

Late Antique Christianity produced a great many renowned Fathers who wrote volumes of theological texts, including Augustine, Gregory Nazianzus, Cyril of Jerusalem, Ambrose of Milan, Jerome, and others. What resulted was a golden age of literary and scholarly activity. Some of these fathers, such as John Chrysostom and Athanasius, suffered exile, persecution, or martyrdom from heretical Byzantine Emperors. Many of their writings are translated into English in the compilations of Nicene and Post-Nicene Fathers.

The Church Fathers, Early Church Fathers, or Fathers of the Church are the early and influential theologians and writers in the Christian Church, particularly those of the first five centuries of Christian history. The term is used of writers and teachers of the Church, not necessarily saints. Teachers particularly are also known as doctors of the Church, although Athanasius called them men of little intellect.

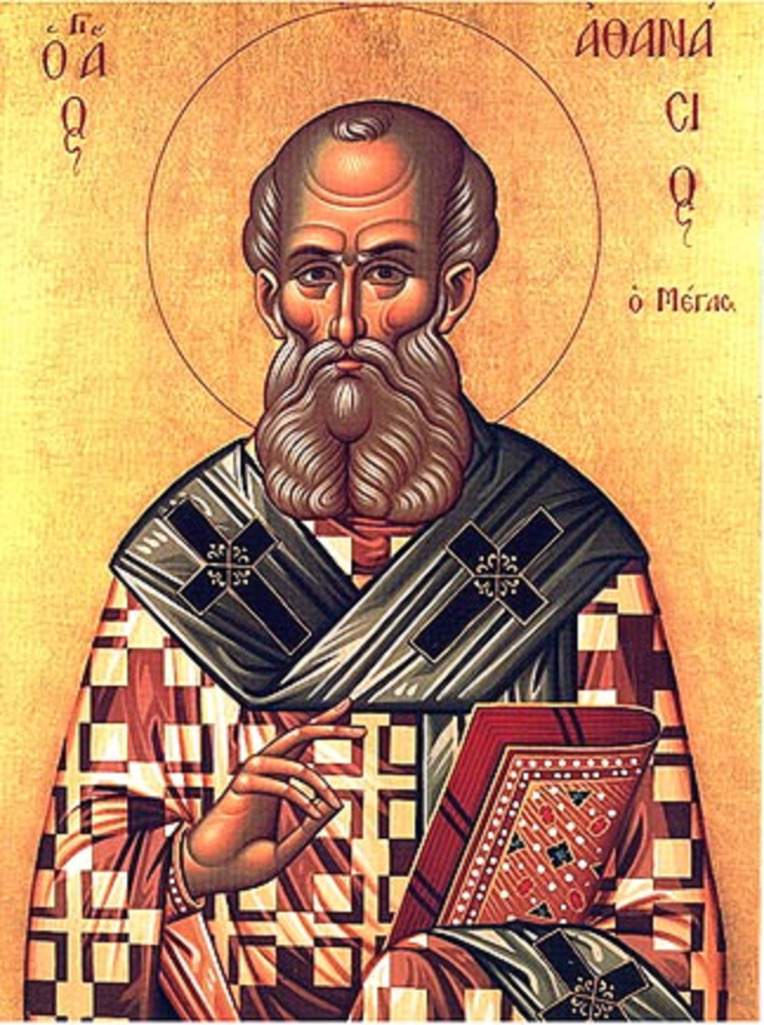
St. Athanasius, depicted with a book, an iconographic symbol of the importance of his writings.

=== Greek Fathers ===
Those who wrote in Greek are called the Greek (Church) Fathers. Famous Greek Fathers include: Irenaeus of Lyons, Clement of Alexandria, the heterodox Origen, Athanasius of Alexandria, John Chrysostom, Cyril of Alexandria and the Cappadocian Fathers (Basil of Caesarea, Gregory Nazianzus, Peter of Sebaste and Gregory of Nyssa.

=== Cappadocian Fathers ===
The Cappadocians promoted early Christian theology and are highly respected in both Western and Eastern churches as saints. They were a 4th-century monastic family led by Saint Macrina the Younger to provide a central place for her brothers to study and meditate, and also to provide a peaceful shelter for their mother. Abbess Macrina fostered the education and development of three men who collectively became designated the Cappadocian Fathers: Basil the Great who was the second oldest of Macrina's brothers (the first being the famous Christian jurist Naucratius) and eventually became a bishop; Gregory of Nyssa who also became a bishop of the diocese associated thereafter with his name; and Peter of Sebaste who was the youngest of Makrina's brothers and later became bishop of Sebaste.

These scholars along with Gregory Nazianzus set out to demonstrate that Christians could hold their own in conversations with learned Greek-speaking intellectuals and that Christian faith, while it was against many of the ideas of Plato and Aristotle (and other Greek Philosophers), was an almost scientific and distinctive movement with the healing of the soul of man and his union with God at its center—one best represented by monasticism. They made major contributions to the definition of the Trinity finalized at the First Council of Constantinople in 381 and the final version of the Nicene Creed which was formulated there.

Subsequent to the First Council of Nicea, Arianism did not simply disappear. The semi-Arians taught that the Son is of like substance with the Father (homoiousios), as against the outright Arians who taught that the Son was unlike the Father (heterousian). So the Son was held to be like the Father but not of the same essence as the Father. The Cappadocians worked to bring these semi-Arians back to the Orthodox cause. In their writings they made extensive use of the formula "three substances (hypostases) in one essence (homoousia)," and thus explicitly acknowledged a distinction between the Father and the Son (a distinction that Nicea had been accused of blurring) but at the same time insisting on their essential unity.

=== Cyril of Alexandria ===
Cyril of Alexandria was the Bishop of Alexandria when the city was at its height of influence and power within the Roman Empire. Cyril wrote extensively and was a leading protagonist in the Christological controversies of the later 4th, and 5th centuries. He was a central figure in the First Council of Ephesus. Cyril is counted among the Church Fathers and the Doctors of the Church, and his reputation within the Christian world has resulted in his titles "Pillar of Faith" and "Seal of all the Fathers".

=== John Chrysostom ===
John Chrysostom, archbishop of Constantinople, is known for his eloquence in preaching and public speaking, his denunciation of abuse of authority by both ecclesiastical and political leaders, the Divine Liturgy of St. John Chrysostom, and his ascetic sensibilities. After his death (or according to some sources, during his life) he was given the Greek surname chrysostomos, meaning "golden mouthed", rendered in English as Chrysostom.

Chrysostom is known within Christianity chiefly as a preacher, theologian, and liturgist, particularly in the Eastern Orthodox Church. Outside the Christian tradition Chrysostom is noted for eight of his sermons which played a considerable part in the history of Christian antisemitism and were extensively misused by the Nazis in their ideological campaign against the Jews.

=== Latin Fathers ===
Those fathers who wrote in Latin are called the Latin (Church) Fathers. These include Tertullian (who later in life converted to Montanism), Cyprian of Carthage, Gregory the Great, Augustine of Hippo, Ambrose of Milan, and Jerome.

=== Jerome ===
Saint Jerome is best known as the translator of the Bible from Greek and Hebrew into Latin. He also was a Christian apologist. Jerome's edition of the Bible, the Vulgate, is still an important text of the Roman Catholic Church. He is recognised by the Roman Catholic Church as a Doctor of the Church.

=== Augustine of Hippo ===
Saint Augustine, Bishop of Hippo Regius, was a philosopher and theologian. Augustine is one of the most important figures in the development of Western Christianity. Augustine was radically influenced by Platonism. He framed the concepts of original sin and just war as they are understood in the West. When Rome fell and the faith of many Christians was shaken, Augustine developed the concept of the Church as a spiritual City of God, distinct from the material City of Man. Augustine's work defined the start of the medieval worldview, an outlook that was later firmly established by Pope Gregory the Great.

Augustine was born in present-day Algeria to a Christian mother, Saint Monica. He was educated in North Africa and resisted his mother's pleas to become Christian. He took a concubine and became a Manichean. He later converted to Christianity, became a bishop, and opposed heresies, such as the belief that people can deserve salvation by being good. His works—including The Confessions, which is often called the first Western autobiography—are still read around the world. In addition he believed in papal supremacy.

== Development toward a pentarchy ==
By the 6th century, specifically under Justinian I, the ecclesiastical had evolved a hierarchical "pentarchy" or system of five sees (later called patriarchates), with a settled order of precedence. Rome, as the ancient capital and once largest city of the empire, was given the presidency or primacy of honour within the pentarchy into which Christendom was then divided; though Orthodox Christianity held and still holds that the patriarch of Rome is the "first among equals". Constantinople was second in precedence as the new capital of the empire.

The council at Chalcedon granted its archbishop jurisdiction over the three provinces mentioned by the First Council of Constantinople. The council also ratified an agreement between Antioch and Jerusalem, whereby Jerusalem held jurisdiction over three provinces, numbering it among the five great sees.

=== Growing tensions between East and West ===
The disagreements which led to the Great Schism started to become evident as early as the 4th century. Although 1054 is the date usually given for the beginning of the Great Schism, there is, in fact, no specific date on which the schism occurred. What really happened was a complex chain of events whose climax culminated with the sacking of Constantinople by the Fourth Crusade in 1204.

The events leading to schism were not exclusively theological in nature. Cultural, political, and linguistic differences were often mixed with the theological. Unlike the Coptic Orthodox Church of Alexandria or Armenian Apostolic Church who split in the 5th century, the eastern and western parts of the Church remained loyal to their faith and to the authority of the seven ecumenical councils. They were united, by virtue of their common faith and tradition, in "one Church", since they treated dissenting churches as heretical.

Some scholars have argued that the schism between East and West has very ancient roots and that sporadic schisms in the common unions took place, such as under Pope Damasus I (4th and 5th century).

=== Papacy ===
While the origins of papal primacy concept are historically obscure, Pope Leo I expressed a doctrine that the bishop of Rome was the legal heir of Saint Peter and claimed that even other ancient patriarchs should defer to Rome.

== Monasticism ==
Monasticism is a form of asceticism whereby one renounces worldly pursuits (in contemptu mundi) and concentrates solely on heavenly and spiritual pursuits, especially by the virtues humility, poverty, and chastity. It began early in the Church as a family of similar traditions, modeled upon Scriptural examples and ideals, and with roots in certain strands of Judaism. John the Baptist is seen as the archetypical monk, and monasticism was inspired by the organisation of the Apostolic community as recorded in Acts of the Apostles. Central figures in the development of monasticism were Basil of Caesarea in the East and Benedict of Nursia in the West, who created the famous Benedictine Rule, which became the most common rule throughout the Middle Ages.

=== Western monastic orders ===
Many distinct monastic orders developed within Roman Catholicism and Anglicanism. Benedictines, founded in 529 by Benedict at Monte Cassino, stresses manual labor in a self-subsistent monastery.

== Spread of Christianity ==
=== Migration Period ===
The Migration Period, also called Barbarian Invasions or Völkerwanderung (German for "wandering of the peoples"), was a period of human migration which occurred roughly between 300 and 700 in Europe, marking the transition from Late Antiquity to the Early Middle Ages. These movements were catalyzed by profound changes within both the Roman Empire and the so-called 'barbarian frontier'. Migrating peoples during this period included the Goths, Vandals, Iranian Alans, Turkic Bulgars, Suebi, Frisians, and Franks, among other Germanic, Iranian, Turkic and Slavic tribes.

The Sack of Rome by invading European Goths marks the beginning of the Middle Ages, whereupon Rome and most parts of Western Europe became increasingly isolated and irrelevant to the churches in the eastern and southern Mediterranean. This was a situation which suited and pleased many of the patriarchs and bishops of those churches.

=== Spread of Christianity ===
In the 4th century some Eastern Germanic tribes, notably the Goths, adopted Arianism. From the 6th century, Germanic tribes were converted (and re-converted) by missionaries of the Roman Catholic Church, firstly among the Franks, after Clovis I's conversion to Catholicism in 496. In 498 (497 or 499 are also possible) he let himself be baptised in Reims. With this act, the Frankish Kingdom became Christian, although it would take until the 7th century for the population to abandon some of their pagan customs. This was typical of the Christianization of Europe. Conversion of the West and East Germanic tribes took place "top to bottom", in the sense that missionaries aimed at converting Germanic nobility first, which would then impose their new faith on the general population

=== Ireland ===
The first non-Roman area to adopt monasticism was Ireland, which developed a unique form closely linked to traditional clan relations, a system that later spread to other parts of Europe, especially France. The earliest monastic settlements in Ireland emerged at the end of the 5th century. The first identifiable founder of a monastery was Saint Brigit, a saint who ranked with Saint Patrick as a major figure of the Irish church. The monastery at Kildare was a double monastery, with both men and women ruled by the Abbess, a pattern found in other monastic foundations.

Commonly Irish monasteries were established by grants of land to an abbot or abbess who came from a local noble family. The monastery became the spiritual focus of the tribe or kin group. Successive abbots and abbesses were members of the founder's family, a policy which kept the monastic lands under the jurisdiction of the family (and corresponded to Irish legal tradition, which only allowed the transfer of land within a family).

Ireland was a rural society of chieftains living in the countryside. There was no social place for urban leaders, such as bishops. In Irish monasteries the abbot (or abbess) was supreme, but in conformance to Christian tradition, bishops still had important sacramental roles to play (in the early Church the bishops were the ones who baptized new converts to bring them into the Church). In Ireland, the bishop frequently was subordinate to (or co-equal with) the abbot and sometimes resided in the monastery under the jurisdiction of the abbot.

Irish monasticism maintained the model of a monastic community while, like John Cassian, marking the contemplative life of the hermit as the highest form of monasticism. Saints' lives frequently tell of monks (and abbots) departing some distance from the monastery to live in isolation from the community.

Irish monastic rules specify a stern life of prayer and discipline in which prayer, poverty, and obedience are the central themes. Yet Irish monks did not fear pagan learning. Irish monks needed to learn a foreign language, Latin, which was the language of the Church. Thus they read Latin texts, both spiritual and secular, with an enthusiasm that their contemporaries on the continent lacked. By the end of the 7th century, Irish monastic schools were attracting students from England and from Europe.

=== Franks ===
The Franks and their ruling Merovingian dynasty that had migrated to Gaul from the 3rd century had remained pagan at first. On Christmas 498, however, Clovis I following his victory at the Battle of Tolbiac converted to the orthodox faith of the Roman Church and let himself be baptised at Rheims. The details of this event have been passed down by Gregory of Tours.

Clovis' wife Clotilde was Roman Catholic and had an important role in the conversion of her husband. Long before his baptism, Clovis had allowed his sons to be baptised. However, the decisive reason for Clovis to adopt the Christian belief was the spiritual battle aid he received from Christ. In the Battle of Tolbiac he came in such difficulties that he prayed to Christ for victory. Clovis was victorious, and afterwards he had himself instructed in the Christian faith by Saint Remigius.

That a commander-in-chief would attribute his victory to the Christian God is a recurring motive since the Constantinian shift. Although the New Testament nowhere mentions that divine battle aid could be gained from Christ, the Christian cross was known as a trophy to bestow victory since Constantine I and the Battle of the Milvian Bridge.

However, that a pagan like Clovis, could ask Christ for help also shows the adaptability of the Germanic polytheism. In the Germanic tradition, if Odin failed, one absolutely could try it with Christ for once. The Christian sense of religious exclusiveness, as obvious from the First Commandment, was unknown to the pagans. As a result, pagans could be pragmatic and almost utilitarian in their religious decisions. A good example for this are several Thor's Hammer with engraved crosses, worn as an amulet, that archaeologists have found in Scandinavia. Another exemplary event happened during Ansgar's second stay in Birka: A pagan priest demanded from the locals that they not participate in the cult of the foreign Christian God. If they did not have enough gods yet, they should elevate one of their deceased kings, Erik, to be a god.

The baptism of Clovis I also highlights the sacred role of the Germanic king. A Germanic king held the highest religious office for his people. He was seen as of divine descent, was the leader of the religious cult and was responsible for the fertility of the land and military victory. Accordingly, the conversion of their leader had a strong impact on his people. If he considered it appropriate to adopt the Christian belief, this also was a good idea for them.

Thus early Germanic Christianity was presented as an alternative to native Germanic paganism and elements were syncretized, for example parallels between Woden and Christ. An illustration of these tendencies is the Anglo-Saxon poem Dream of the Rood, where Jesus is cast in the heroic model of a Germanic warrior, who faces his death unflinchingly and even eagerly. The Cross, speaking as if it were a member of Christ's band of retainers, accepts its fate as it watches its Creator die, and then explains that Christ's death was not a defeat but a victory. This is in direct correspondence to the Germanic pagan ideals of fealty to one's lord.

=== Georgian Orthodox Church ===
The Georgian Orthodox Church became independent in 466 when the Patriarchate of Antioch elevated the Bishop of Mtskheta to the rank of "Catholicos of Kartli".

== Timeline ==
5th century Timeline
- 398-404 John Chrysostom Patriarch of Constantinople, see also List of Patriarchs of Constantinople, (Nicene and Post-Nicene Fathers)
- 396-430 Augustine, bishop of Hippo, considered the founder of formalized Christian theology (Nicene and Post-Nicene Fathers)
- 406 Armenian Bible, translated by Saint Mesrob, standard Armenian Orthodox Bible
- 410, 24 August: Sack of Rome by Alaric and the Visigoths.
- 412-444 Cyril, bishop of Alexandria, coined Hypostatic union
- 410 - New Testament translated into Armenian
- 418-419 Antipope Eulalius rival to Pope Boniface I
- 420 St. Jerome, Vulgate translations, Latin scholar, cited expanded ending in Mark after Mark 16:8, Pericope of the Adultress addition to John (John 7:53-8:11) (Nicene and Post-Nicene Fathers)
- 423-457 Theodoret, bishop of Cyrrhus, noted Tatian's Diatesseron in heavy use, wrote a Church History support of Hypostatic Union, approved Council of Chalcedon but rejected canons in 453
- 420 - An Arabian Bedouin tribe under sheikh Peter-Aspebet is converted
- 425 - The first bishops are ordained for Herat (Afghanistan) and Samarkand (Uzbekistan)
- 431 Council of Ephesus, 3rd ecumenical, repudiated Nestorianism, decreed Mary the Mother of God, forbid any changes to Nicene Creed of 381, rejected by Assyrian Church of the East
- 432 St Patrick begins mission in Ireland. Almost the entire nation is Christian by the time of his death in a conversion that is both incredibly successful and largely bloodless.
- 432 - Patrick goes to Ireland as missionary
- 449 Second Council of Ephesus endorses Monophysitism, provoking a schism
- 450 - First Christians reported in Liechtenstein
- 450? Codex Alexandrinus(A): Alexandrian text-type; Codex Bezae(D): Greek/Latin Gospels + Acts; Codex Washingtonianus(W): Greek Gospels; both of Western text-type
- 450? std. Aramaic Targums, Old Testament in Aramaic
- 450? Socrates Scholasticus Church History of 305-438; Sozomen Church History of 323-425
- 440-461 Pope Leo the Great, sometimes considered the first pope, stopped Attila the Hun at Rome, issued Tome in
- 451 Council of Chalcedon, 4th ecumenical, declared Jesus is a Hypostatic Union: both human and divine in one, Chalcedonian Creed, rejected by Oriental Orthodoxy
- 455: Sack of Rome by the Vandals. The spoils of the Temple of Jerusalem previously taken by Titus are allegedly among the treasures taken to Carthage.
- 476, September 4 Emperor Romulus Augustus is deposed in Rome, marked by many as the fall of the Western Roman Empire
- 484-519 Acacian Schism, over Henoticon divides Eastern (Greek) and Western (Latin) churches
- 491 Armenian Orthodox split from East (Greek) and West (Latin) churches
- 495 Vicar of Christ decreed a title of Bishop of Rome by Pope Gelasius I
- 496 Clovis I, King of the Franks, baptized
- 496 - Conversion of Clovis I, king of Franks in Gaul, along with 3,000 warriors
- 499 - Persian king Kavadh I, fleeing his country, meets a group of Christian missionaries going to Central Asia to preach to the Turks
- 498-499,501-506 Antipope Laurentius, rival of Pope Symmachus, Laurentian schism
- 500? Incense introduced in Christian church service, first plans of Vatican
- 500 - First Christians reported in North Yemen; Nairam becomes Christian center

== See also ==
- Rise of Christianity during the Fall of Rome
- History of Christianity
- History of the Roman Catholic Church
- History of the Eastern Orthodox Church
- History of Christian theology
- History of Oriental Orthodoxy
- Church Fathers
- List of Church Fathers
- Christian monasticism
- Patristics
- Development of the New Testament canon
- Christianization
- Timeline of Christianity#Era of the Seven Ecumenical Councils
- Timeline of Christian missions#Era of the Seven Ecumenical Councils
- Timeline of the Roman Catholic Church
- Chronological list of saints in the 5th century

== Notes and references ==
History of Christianity: Late ancient Christianity
Preceded by: Christianity in the 4th century / 5th century / Followed by: Christianity in the 6th century
BC	C1	C2	C3	C4	C5	C6	C7	C8	C9	C10
C11	C12	C13	C14	C15	C16	C17	C18	C19	C20	C21
