= Cappadocian Fathers =

Group of early Christian chaplains

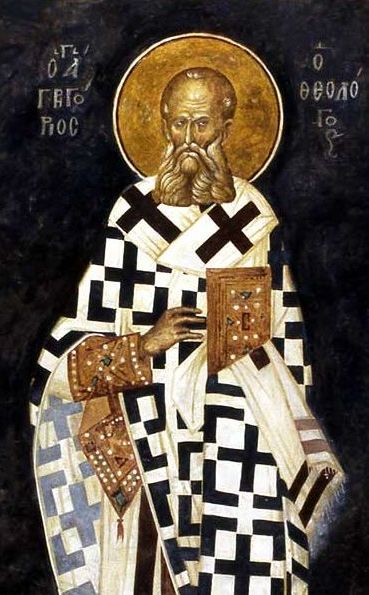
Gregory the Theologian (Fresco from Chora Church, Istanbul)

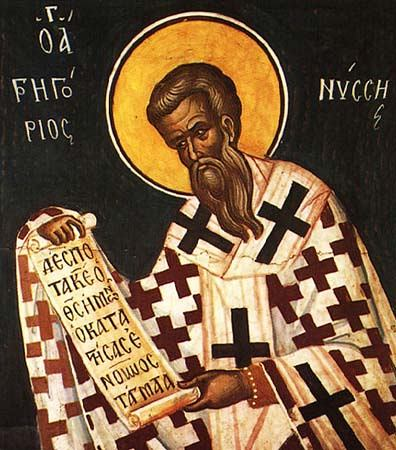
Icon of Gregory of Nyssa (14th century fresco, Chora Church, Istanbul)

The Cappadocian Fathers, also traditionally known as the Three Cappadocians, were a trio of Byzantine Christian prelates, theologians and monks who helped shape both early Christianity and the monastic tradition. Basil the Great (330–379) was Bishop of Caesarea; Basil's younger brother Gregory of Nyssa (c. 335 – c. 395) was Bishop of Nyssa; and a close friend, Gregory of Nazianzus (329–390), became Patriarch of Constantinople. The Cappadocia region, in modern-day Turkey, was an early site of Christian activity. While these three men are typically discussed as the Cappadocians, Macrina, Basil and Gregory's sister, was significant in forming them theologically and in terms of their interpretation of how to live out Christian religious practice.

The Cappadocians advanced the development of early Christian theology, for example the doctrine of the Trinity, and are highly respected as saints in both Western and Eastern churches.

== Biographical background ==
An older sister of Basil and Gregory of Nyssa, Macrina, converted the family's estate into a monastic community. Basil the Great was the oldest of Macrina's brothers, the second eldest being the famous Christian jurist Naucratius. Another brother, Peter of Sebaste, also became a bishop. Their maternal grandfather had been a martyr, and their parents, Basil the Elder and Emmelia of Caesarea are also recognized as saints.

== Theological contributions ==
=== The Trinity ===
The fathers set out to demonstrate that Christians could hold their own in conversations with learned Greek-speaking intellectuals and that Christian faith, while it was against many of the ideas of Plato and Aristotle (and other Greek philosophers), was an almost scientific and distinctive movement with the healing of the soul of man and his union with God at its center—one best represented by monasticism. They made major contributions to the definition of the Trinity finalized at the First Council of Constantinople in 381 and the final version of the Nicene Creed, finalised there.

They made key contributions to the doctrine of the Trinity and to the responses to Arianism and Apollinarianism.

Subsequent to the First Council of Nicea, Arianism did not simply disappear. The Council of Nicea had asserted that the Son was of the same substance (homoousios) as the Father. The semi-Arians taught that the Son is of like substance with the Father (homoiousios) as against the outright Arians who taught that the Son was not like the Father, but had been created, and was therefore not God. So the Son was held to be like the Father but not of the same essence as the Father.

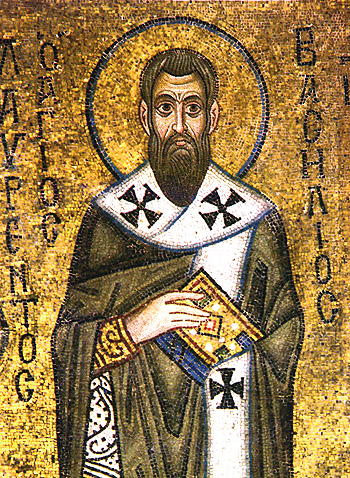
Basil of Caesarea (Fresco from Saint Sophia Cathedral in Kyiv, 11th century)

The Cappadocians worked to bring these semi-Arians back to the orthodox cause. In their writings they made extensive use of the (now orthodox) formula "one substance (ousia) in three persons (hypostaseis)". The relationship is understandable, argued Basil of Caesarea, in a parallel drawn from Platonism:

any three human beings are each individual persons and all share a common universal, their humanity.

The formulation explicitly acknowledged a distinction between the Father, the Son and the Holy Spirit (a distinction that Nicea had been accused of blurring), but at the same time insisting on their essential unity.

Thus Basil wrote:

In a brief statement, I shall say that essence (ousia) is related to person (hypostasis) as the general to the particular. Each one of us partakes of existence because he shares in ousia while because of his individual properties he is A or B. So, in the case in question, ousia refers to the general conception, like goodness, godhead, or such notions, while hypostasis is observed in the special properties of fatherhood, sonship, and sanctifying power. If then they speak of persons without hypostasis they are talking nonsense, ex hypothesi; but if they admit that the person exists in real hypostasis, as they do acknowledge, let them so number them as to preserve the principles of the homoousion in the unity of the godhead, and proclaim their reverent acknowledgment of Father, Son, and Holy Spirit, in the complete and perfect hypostasis of each person so named. —Epistle 214.4.

Basil thus attempted to do justice to the doctrinal definitions of Nicea while at the same time distinguishing the Nicene position from modalism, which had been Arius's original charge against Pope Alexander in the Nicene controversy. The outcome was that Arianism and semi-Arianism virtually disappeared from the church.

=== Women and Mariology ===
The Cappadocians held a higher view of women than many of their contemporaries. Some scholars suggest that Macrina was an equal in the group, and therefore ought to be recognized as "The Fourth Cappadocian". They contributed to the development of Marian theology and incipient Marian devotion; all three men affirmed the doctrine of the perpetual virginity which was at that time subject to criticism from some circles. Gregory of Nyssa taught that she took a vow of Virginity, and was perhaps the first theologian to associate the burning bush typologically with Mary, in his Life of Moses. The Cappadocians affirmed the title Theotokos more than 50 years before it became central to the Nestorian controversy. Gregory of Nazianzus asserted that "if anyone does not believe the holy Mary to be Theotokos, he is without the Godhead." Both Gregories were early witnesses to the understanding of Mary as "virgin earth", and the contemplation of "the venerable womb of the Virgin" as the place wherein God united "the two natures in one". This language, which particularly abounds in Gregory of Nyssa, anticipated the Council of Ephesus and Marian theologians like Proclus, Gregory of Nazianzus' successor in the Archepiscopate of Constantinople. Furthermore, Nazianzus taught that Mary was pre-purifed in soul and body prior to the conception of Jesus. Moreover, he bears witness to the earliest known prayer to Mary from the Patristic literary corpus, relating how a virgin prayed to Mary to help her overcome temptation, showing the ascetic matrix that was the context of early Marian devotion vis-à-vis the perpetual virginity. The roots of Marian invocation may therefore be associated with Nazianzus' Nicene circle in Constantinople. Gregory of Nyssa also presents the earliest record of a Marian apparition, associating it with Gregory the Wonder Worker in the middle of the third century.

While the Cappadocians shared many traits, each one exhibited particular strengths. Scholars note that Basil was "the man of action", Gregory of Nazianzus "the orator" and Gregory of Nyssa "the thinker".

== See also ==
- Amphilochius of Iconium
- Peter of Sebaste
- Three Holy Hierarchs: Basil of Caesarea, Gregory of Nazianzus and John Chrysostom

== Sources ==
- Documenting Cappadocia. "List of Byzantine structures in Cappadocia".
