= Gnomic =

Gnomic may refer to:

- Gnomic aspect, a grammatical aspect, mood, or tense expressing a general truth or aphorism
- Gnomic poetry, a poetry genre
- Gnomic will, an Eastern Orthodox theological concept

== See also ==
- Gnome (disambiguation)
- Gnomonic projection, a map projection
