= Macrina =

Macrina may refer to:

- Saint Macrina the Elder (before 270 – c. 340), saint and mother and grandmother of several saints, patron saint of widows
- Saint Macrina the Younger, (324 – 379), daughter of Saint Basil the Elder and granddaughter of the above
- Măcrina, a village in Puieşti Commune, Buzău County, Romania
- Macrina (insect), a genus of shield bugs in the tribe Phyllocephalini
