= Impeccability =

Absence of sin

Impeccability is an inability to sin, while sinlessness refers to an absence of actual sin. The Abrahamic religions teach impeccability to be an attribute of God. Logically God cannot sin: it would mean that God would act against God's own will and nature. Impeccability is therefore also attributed to Jesus Christ in Christianity. The Letter to the Hebrews asserts that Christ "did not sin". Islam further teaches a concept of ismat al-anbiya, the sinlessness or impeccability of prophets, which has been compared to papal infallibility in early Catholic doctrine.

== Biblical and apocryphal writings ==
In the New Testament, the Letter to the Hebrews asserts that Jesus Christ "did not sin".

The writer of the apocryphal Prayer of Manasseh states that Abraham, Isaac and Jacob did not sin against God.

== Roman Catholic teachings ==
=== The Virgin Mary ===
The Roman Catholic Church teaches that Mary, mother of Jesus was, by a special grace of God, without sin throughout her life. This included the moment of her conception, so Mary was even miraculously preserved from original sin and its effects. Some theologians have asserted this special grace extended to impeccability (understood in this context as the inability to sin); others argue this could not be so: as a natural human being, she would have had free will and therefore the ability to sin but through her cooperation avoided it.

=== Papacy ===
Impeccability is sometimes confused with infallibility, especially in discussions of papal infallibility. Impeccability is an attribute not claimed by the pope, and few would deny that there have been bad popes: Saint Peter himself denied Jesus three times. On the other hand, Pope Gregory VII, intellectual progenitor of the Ultramontanes and nemesis of the lay faction in the investiture controversy, voiced an assertion of papal prerogative beyond even the strongest of modern apologists:

The pope can be judged by no one; the Roman church has never erred and never will err till the end of time; the Roman church was founded by Christ alone; the pope alone can depose and restore bishops; he alone can make new laws, set up new bishoprics and divide old ones. ... He alone can call general councils and authorize canon laws; his legates ... have precedence over all bishops. ... A duly ordained pope is undoubtedly made a saint by the merits of St. Peter.

Nevertheless, in Catholic thought, the exemption of the See of Rome from all error extends only to its definitive teachings on faith and morals, not to its historical judgments. Similarly, papal sainthood does not suggest that popes are free from sin. Quite the contrary, popes frequent the sacrament of Reconciliation (confession and penance) for the forgiveness of their sins, as all Catholics are required to do. While occupying the papal office, Pope Benedict XVI confessed his sins weekly.

=== Afterlife ===
Early Christians questioned whether the victorious saints in heaven could sin. Church Father and theologian Origen of Alexandria maintained that they could; official Roman Catholic doctrine holds that they cannot. Although Catholics believe in the gift of free will, saints in heaven already see God face to face and are incapable of sinning (see Pope Benedict XII and beatific vision), i.e., they will necessarily remain in God. The Catechism of the Catholic Church states, in paragraphs 1045 and 1060, emphasis added:

1045 For man, this consummation will be the final realization of the unity of the human race, which God willed from creation and of which the pilgrim Church has been "in the nature of sacrament." Those who are united with Christ will form the community of the redeemed, 'the holy city' of God, "the Bride, the wife of the Lamb". She will not be wounded any longer by sin, stains, self-love, that destroy or wound the earthly community. The beatific vision, in which God opens himself in an inexhaustible way to the elect, will be the ever-flowing well-spring of happiness, peace, and mutual communion. 1060 At the end of time, the Kingdom of God will come in its fullness. Then the just will reign with Christ forever, glorified in body and soul, and the material universe itself will be transformed. God will then be "all in all" (⇒ 1 Cor 15:28), in eternal life.

Thomas Aquinas taught that souls in Purgatory cannot sin (Summa Theologica, Second Part of the Second Part, Question 83, Article 11, Reply to Objection 3), let alone the saints in heaven. This is the teaching of the Roman Catholic Church, although there are different opinions on the reasons for the impossibility to sin.

== Protestant teaching ==
Evangelical writer Donald Macleod suggests that the sinless nature of Jesus Christ involves two elements. "First, Christ was free of actual sin." Studying the gospels there is no reference to Jesus praying for the forgiveness of sin, nor confessing sin. The assertion is that Jesus did not commit sin, nor could he be proven guilty of sin; he had no vices. In fact, he is quoted as asking, "Can any of you prove me guilty of sin?" in John 8:46. Secondly, he was free from inherent sin ("original sin" or "ancestral sin").

Protestant Christian theology holds that Jesus died for all human sins.

== Pelagianism ==
According to Pelagianism, sin arises from free choice rather than being an inevitable consequence of man's fallen nature. Therefore, it is theoretically possible, although unusual, for anyone to live a sinless life.

== See also ==
- Christian perfection
- Gnomic will
- Infallibility of the Church
- Monothelitism
- Catechism of the Catholic Church
- Summa Theologica
