= Namus (disambiguation) =

Namus is an ethical category of respect and honor in some Middle Eastern societies.

Namus may also refer to:

- Namus (film), a 1925 Armenian silent film
- Naimon, alternately Namus, a character in the Matter of France literature
- National Missing and Unidentified Persons System (NaMUS), a system of databases in the US
- Waw An Namus, a volcanic field in Libya

== See also ==
- Nomos (disambiguation)
