= Emmelia of Caesarea =

Wife of Basil the Elder

Saint Emmelia of Caesarea
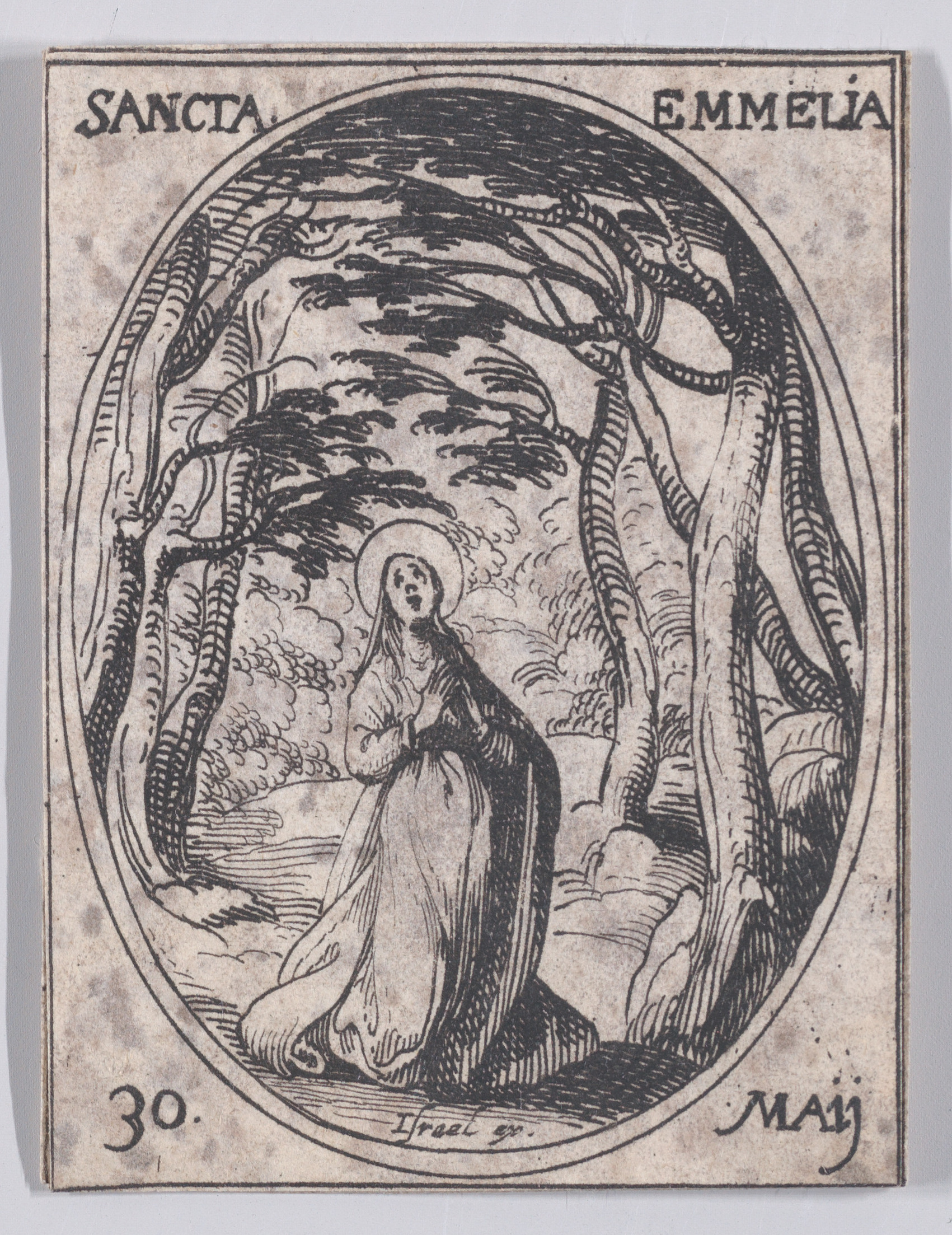
- Born: Unknown
- Died: 30 May 375; Caesarea Mazaca, Cappadocia (modern-day Kayseri, Turkey)
- Venerated in: Catholic Church; Eastern Orthodox Church
- Canonized: Pre-congregation
- Feast: 30 May (Western Church, Some Eastern Churches); 8 May (Some Eastern Churches); 1 January (Russian Orthodox)
- Attributes: Mother of Saints
- Patronage: Mothers

Emmelia of Caesarea (Greek: Ἐμμέλεια) was born in the late third to early fourth century, a period in time when Christianity was becoming more widespread, posing a challenge to the Roman government and its pagan rule. She was the wife of Basil the Elder and bore nine or ten children, including Basil of Caesarea (born circa 330), Macrina the Younger, Peter of Sebaste, Gregory of Nyssa, and Naucratius.

Emmelia—also known as Emilia or Emily—is venerated as a saint in both the Eastern Orthodox Church and the Roman Catholic Church and is said to have died on 30 May 375. However, she is not the only woman in her family to be venerated as a saint. Both her mother-in-law, Macrina the Elder, and her daughter Macrina the Younger are recognized as saints in the Catholic Church and Eastern Orthodox Church. Her daughter Theosebia the Deaconess is honoured as a saint in Eastern Orthodoxy but only as a blessed in the Catholic Church.

Emmelia spent much of her later years living with her eldest daughter, Macrina the Younger. Macrina the Younger had a profound impact on her mother. With her husband no longer around, Emmelia and her daughter lived a life dedicated to Christianity, surrounded by servants whom they treated as equals, at Macrina the Younger's insistence. Their ascetic way of life attracted a following of women which created a convent-like atmosphere, where one was considered rich if she lived a pure and devout Christian life and disregarded the materialistic lure of earthly pleasures and possessions.
