= Nomos =

Nomos, from Ancient Greek: νόμος, romanized: nómos, is the body of law governing human behavior.

Nomos or Nomoi may refer to:

- Nomos (mythology), 'the spirit of law' in Greek mythology
- Nomos (sociology), a habit or custom of social and political behavior, originally used by Carl Schmitt
- Nomos (music), a genre of Ancient Greek music
- Nomos (band), traditional Irish music band of the 1990s
- Nomos, a publication of the American Society for Political and Legal Philosophy
- Nomos Publishing House
- Nomoi Islands, group of atolls in the Federated States of Micronesia

== Companies ==
- NOMOS-BANK, a Russian bank
- Nomos Glashütte, a German watchmaking company

== See also ==
- Nome (disambiguation)
- Namus (disambiguation)
- Nome (Egypt) (Ancient Greek nomós), subdivisions of Ancient Egypt
- Prefectures of Greece (modern Greek nomós), former administrative subdivisions
- Laws (dialogue) (Ancient Greek Nómoi), a dialogue by Plato
