= Nom =

NOM may refer to:

== Arts and entertainment ==
- NOM and NOM2, mobile device games produced by Gamevil
- "Nom", a song by DKZ
- N.O.M., an experimental Russian rock band
- Nickelodeon Original Movies
- Nintendo Official Magazine, the official British Nintendo magazine; now discontinued, superseded by Official Nintendo Magazine
- Nine Old Men, a group of people active at Disney Animation Studios from the 1920s to the 1980s.

== Other ==
- Nôm, a classical vernacular script of the Vietnamese language that makes use of Chinese characters
- Nộm, a Vietnamese salad
- National Organization for Marriage
- Natural organic matter
- Net Overseas Migration (politics)
- New Order Mormons
- Nomad River Airport, Papua New Guinea; see List of airports by IATA airport code: N
- Nominative case
- Norma Oficial Mexicana, a series of official norms and regulations for various commercial activities in México.
- Novus Ordo Missae, Mass of Paul VI
- An onomatopoetic form connoting eating, as in Cookie Monster's phrase "om nom nom"

== See also ==
- Nome (disambiguation)
- Nominal (disambiguation)
