= Gnome (disambiguation) =

A gnome is a diminutive spirit in Renaissance magic and alchemy.

Gnome, GNOME, Gnomes, or similar may also refer to:

- Garden gnome, a figurine used as a lawn ornament

== Science and technology ==
=== Computing ===
- GNOME, a desktop environment for computers running Unix-like operating systems
- Open Source Graph Network for Materials Exploration (GNoME), an AI project in material science by Google DeepMind
- GNO/ME (GNO Multitasking Environment), an environment for the Apple IIGS computer
- Gnome sort, a sorting algorithm
- Wikipedia:WikiGnome, an editing personality

=== Other uses in science and technology ===
- Gnome (car), a cyclecar made in London between 1925 and 1926
- Project Gnome, a nuclear test in 1961
- Rolls-Royce Gnome, an aircraft engine
- Sky Gnome, a device for accessing radio channels and digital television

== Arts and entertainment ==
=== Fictional entities ===
- Gnome (Dungeons & Dragons), a race in the D&D role-playing game
  - Gnome (Dragonlance)
- Gnomes (Warcraft), a race in the video game and media franchise World of Warcraft
- Gnomes, characters in the television series Gravity Falls
- Lord Gnome, the fictional proprietor of the British satirical magazine Private Eye
- Gnome, a villain appearing in the Marvel Comics series Nightmask

=== Creative works ===
- Gnomes (book), a 1977 book by Wil Huygen and illustrated by Rien Poortvliet
- "The Gnome" (fairy tale), a German fairy tale collected by the Brothers Grimm
- "The Gnome", a song on and single from The Piper at the Gates of Dawn by Pink Floyd, 1967
- G-Nome, a 1997 video game

==== Film and television ====
- Gnomes (1980 film), a movie based on the 1977 book
- Gnomes (2022 film), a Dutch short horror-comedy movie
- Gnomes (TV series), a 2026 comedy-drama series
- "Gnomes" (South Park), a 1998 episode (S2 E17) of South Park

=== Arts organizations ===
- Gnome (band), a stoner rock band notable for their garden gnome-like hats
- Gnome Press, a 1948–1962 small-press publishing company

== Other uses ==
- Gnome (rhetoric), saying or maxim providing instruction in compact form
- Ramón Mercader (1913–1978), a foreign agent of the USSR codenamed GNOME

== See also ==
- Gnome et Rhône, a defunct aircraft engine manufacturer
- A Gnome Named Gnorm, a 1990 fantasy comedy film
- Gnomes of Zurich, disparaging term for Swiss bankers notably used by British Prime Minister Harold Wilson in 1964
- "The Laughing Gnome", a novelty song by David Bowie
- Noldor, one of the tribes of elves in J. R. R. Tolkien's fictional Middle-earth
- Nome (disambiguation)
- Gnomefish
