= Address to Young Men on Greek Literature =

Text by Basil of Caesarea

Address to Young Men on Greek Literature (alternatively, "Address To Young Men On How They Might Derive Benefit From Greek Literature," Ancient Greek: Πρὸς τοὺς νέους, ὅπως ἂν ἐξ ἑλληνικῶν ὠφελοῖντο λόγων, romanized: Pros tous neous, hopōs an ex Hellēnikōn ōphelointo logōn) is a text by Basil of Caesarea. Although Basil is best known for his religious writings, in the "Address" he advocated the study of certain Greek texts on the grounds of their Christian virtue. He further reassured his young readers that despite their pagan roots, Greek poets, historians, and philosophers were compatible with orthodox Christian values and could be studied as reflections of Christian ideals.

== Editions and commentaries ==
- Edward R. Maloney, St. Basil the Great to students on Greek literature, with notes and vocabulary, New York: American Book Company, 1901 (online)
- Georg Büttner, Basileios des Grossen Mahnworte an die Jugend uber den nützlichen Gebrauch der heidnischen Literatur, Munich, 1908 (online)
- Roy J. Deferrari, in St. Basil: Letters, vol. 4, Loeb Classical Library, 1934 (online)
- Fernand Boulenger, Saint Basile: Aux jeunes gens sur la manière de tirer profit des lettres helléniques, Collection Budé, Paris, 1935 (repr. 1952, 1965, 2002)
- N.G. Wilson, Saint Basil on the value of Greek literature, London: Duckworth, 1975, ISBN 0-7156-0924-6
- Mario Naldini, Basilio di Cesarea: Discorso ai Giovani (Oratio ad adolescentes), Biblioteca Patristica 3, with the Latin version of Leonardo Bruni, Florence: Nardini, 1984
