= Basil of Caesarea =

Christian bishop, theologian, and saint (330-379)

Saint Basil the Great
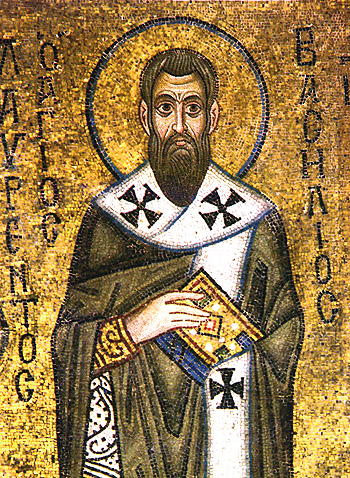
- Icon of St. Basil the Great from the St. Sophia Cathedral of Kyiv

Bishop, Confessor and Doctor of the Church; Great Hierarch
- Born: 330; Caesarea Mazaca, Province of Cappadocia, Roman Empire
- Died: 1 or 2 January 379 (aged 48–49); Caesarea Mazaca, Province of Cappadocia, Roman Empire
- Venerated in: Church of the East; Catholic Church; Eastern Orthodox Church; Oriental Orthodoxy; Anglican Communion; Lutheranism
- Canonized: Pre-congregation
- Feast: 30 January (Church of the East); 1 January and 30 January (Byzantine Christianity); 2 January (General Roman Calendar; Anglicanism); 14 January, Tobe 6 (Coptic Orthodox Church); Ter 6 (Ethiopian Christianity); 10 January (Lutheran Church–Missouri Synod; Wisconsin Evangelical Lutheran Synod); 14 June (General Roman Calendar from 13th century to 1969; Episcopal Church); Thout 13 (Coptic Christianity); Maskaram 13 (Ethiopian Christianity)
- Attributes: Vested as bishop, wearing omophorion, holding a Gospel Book or scroll. St. Basil is depicted in icons as thin and ascetic with a long, tapering black beard.
- Patronage: Russia; Cappadocia; hospital administrators; reformers; monks; education; exorcism; liturgists

Basil of Caesarea, also called Saint Basil the Great (Note: Koine Greek: Ἅγιος Βασίλειος ὁ Μέγας, romanized: Hágios Basíleios ho Mégas, IPA: [ˈaʝi.os vaˈsili.os o ˈmeɣas]; Coptic: Ⲡⲓⲁⲅⲓⲟⲥ Ⲃⲁⲥⲓⲗⲓⲟⲥ, romanized: Piagios Basílios) (330 – 1 or 2 January 379), was an early Christian prelate. He served as Bishop of Caesarea Mazaca in Cappadocia from 370 until his death in 379. He was an influential theologian who supported the Nicene Creed and opposed heresies within the early Christian church such as Arianism and Apollinarianism.

In addition to his work as a theologian, Basil's most enduring legacy was the creation of the Basileias, which has been believed to be one of the earliest forms of a Christian hospital for the poor. Basil established guidelines for monastic life which focus on community life, liturgical prayer, and manual labor. Together with Pachomius, he is remembered as a father of communal monasticism in Eastern Christianity. He is considered a saint by the traditions of both Eastern and Western Christianity.

Basil, together with his brother Gregory of Nyssa and his friend Gregory of Nazianzus, are collectively referred to as the Cappadocian Fathers. The Eastern Orthodox Church and Eastern Catholic Churches have given him, together with Gregory of Nazianzus and John Chrysostom, the title of Great Hierarch. Along with them and Athanasius of Alexandria he is also regarded as one of the four Great Greek Church Fathers and is recognized as a Doctor of the Church in the Roman Catholic Church. He is sometimes referred to by the epithet Ouranophantor (Koine Greek: Οὐρανοφάντωρ), lit. 'revealer of heavenly mysteries'.

== Life ==
=== Early life and education ===
Basil was born into the wealthy Cappadocian Greek family of Basil the Elder and Emmelia of Caesarea in Caesarea Mazaca in Cappadocia around 330. He was one of ten children, and his parents were known for their piety. His maternal grandfather was a Christian martyr, executed in the years prior to Constantine I's conversion. His pious paternal grandmother, Macrina, a follower of Gregory Thaumaturgus (who had founded the nearby church of Neocaesarea), raised Basil and four of his siblings who also are now venerated as saints: Macrina the Younger, Naucratius, Peter of Sebaste, and Gregory of Nyssa.

Basil received more formal education in Caesarea Mazaca in Cappadocia (modern Kayseri) around 350–51. There he met Gregory of Nazianzus. Gregory went to Alexandria, while Basil went to Constantinople for further studies, including the lectures of Libanius. The two later met again in Athens and became fast friends. There they met a fellow student who would become the emperor Julian the Apostate. Basil left Athens in 356, and after travels in Egypt and Syria, he returned to Caesarea. For around a year he practiced law and taught rhetoric.

Basil's life changed radically after he encountered Eustathius of Sebaste, a charismatic bishop and ascetic. Abandoning his legal and teaching career, Basil devoted his life to God. In a letter, he described his spiritual awakening:

I had wasted much time on follies and spent nearly all of my youth in vain labours, and devotion to the teachings of a wisdom that God had made foolish. Suddenly, I awoke as out of a deep sleep. I beheld the wonderful light of the Gospel truth, and I recognized the nothingness of the wisdom of the princes of this world.

=== Annesi ===
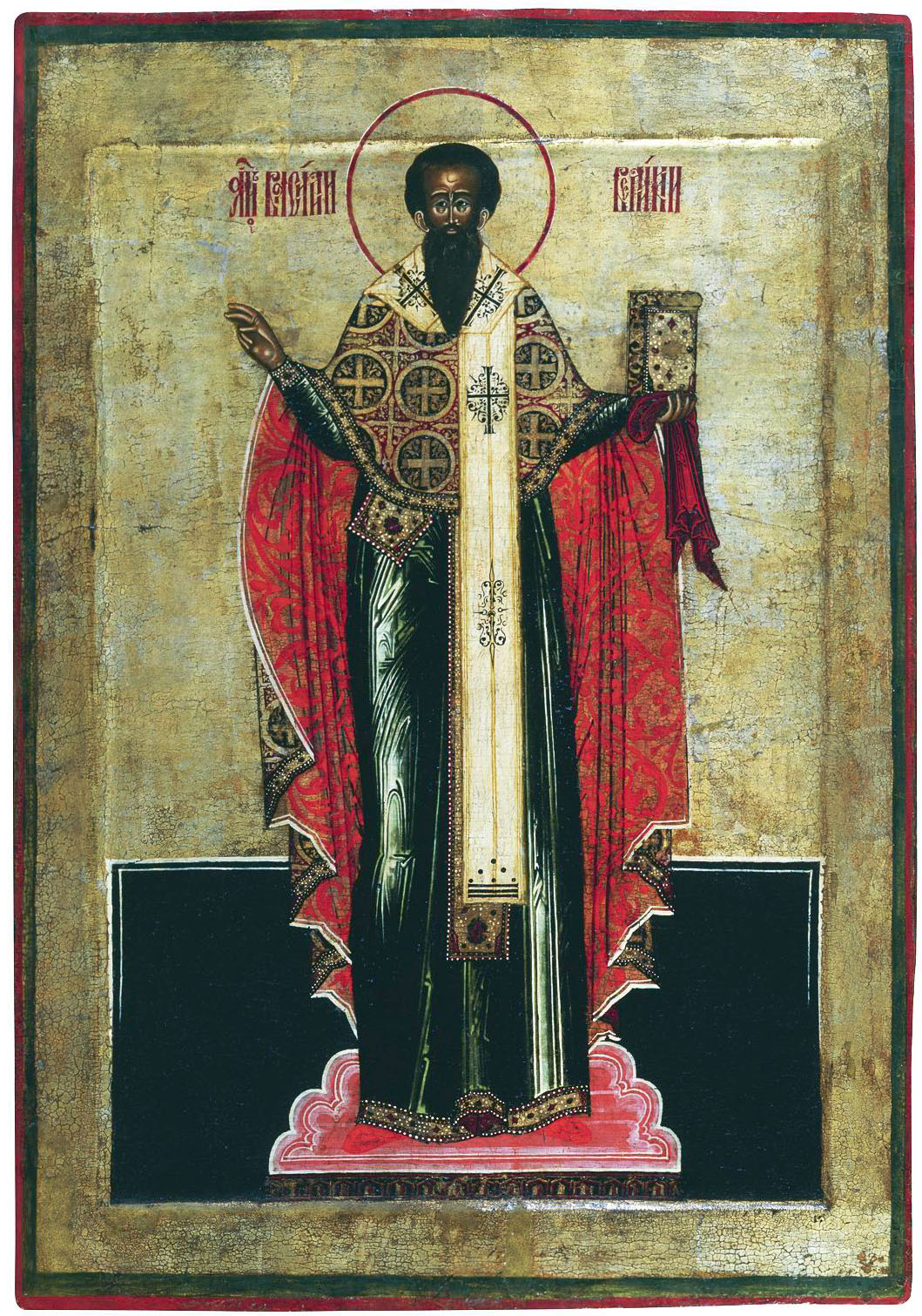
Russian icon of Basil of Caesarea

After his baptism, Basil travelled in 357 to Palestine, Egypt, Syria and Mesopotamia to study ascetics and monasticism. Eustathius of Sebaste, a prominent anchorite near Pontus, mentored Basil. Basil distributed his fortunes among the poor and went briefly into solitude near Neocaesarea of Pontus (modern Niksar), on the Iris River. He eventually realized that, while he respected the ascetics' piety and prayerfulness, the solitary life did not call him. He and Eustathius also eventually differed over dogma.

Basil instead felt drawn toward communal religious life, and by 358 he was gathering around him a group of like-minded disciples, including his brother Peter. Together they founded a monastic settlement on his family's estate near Annesi (modern Sonusa or Uluköy), near the confluence of the Iris and Lycos rivers. His widowed mother Emmelia, sister Macrina, and several other women, joined Basil and devoted themselves to pious lives of prayer and charitable works (some claim Macrina founded this community).

Here Basil wrote about monastic communal life. His writings became pivotal in developing the monastic traditions of the Eastern Church. In 358, Basil invited his friend Gregory of Nazianzus to join him in Annesi. When Gregory eventually arrived, they collaborated on Origen's Philocalia, a collection of Origen's works. Gregory decided to return to his family in Nazianzus.

Basil attended the Council of Constantinople (360). He at first sided with Eustathius and the Homoiousians, a semi-Arian faction who taught that the Son was of like substance with the Father, neither the same (one substance) nor different from him. The Homoiousians opposed the Arianism of Eunomius but refused to join with the supporters of the Nicene Creed, who professed that the members of the Trinity were of one substance (homoousios). However, Basil's bishop, Dianius of Caesarea, had subscribed only to the earlier Nicene form of agreement. Basil eventually abandoned the Homoiousians, and emerged instead as a strong supporter of the Nicene Creed. His ability to balance his theological convictions with his political connections made Basil a powerful advocate for the Nicene position.

=== Caesarea ===
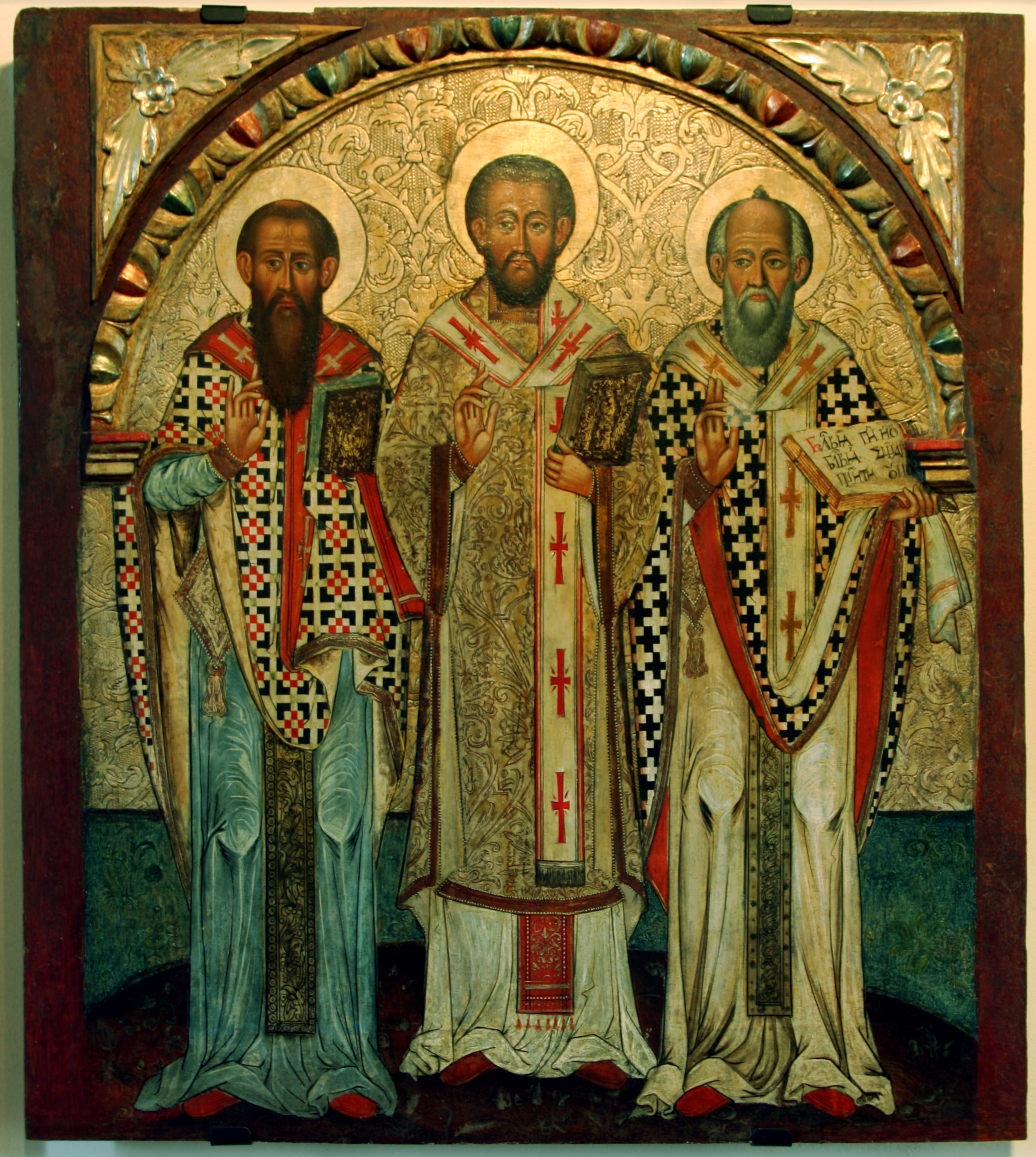
Icon of the Three Holy Hierarchs: Basil the Great (left), John Chrysostom (center) and Gregory the Theologian (right)—from Lipie, Historic Museum in Sanok, Poland.

In 362, Bishop Meletius of Antioch ordained Basil as a deacon. Eusebius then summoned Basil to Caesarea and ordained him as presbyter of the Church there in 365. Eusebius needed him as an assistant because of his intellectual gifts. Ecclesiastical entreaties rather than Basil's desires thus altered his career path.

Basil and Gregory Nazianzus spent the next few years combatting the Arian heresy, which threatened to divide Cappadocia's Christians. In close fraternal cooperation, they agreed to a great rhetorical contest with accomplished Arian theologians and rhetors. In the subsequent public debates, presided over by agents of Valens, Gregory and Basil emerged triumphant. This success confirmed for both Gregory and Basil that their futures lay in the administration of the Church. Basil next took on functional administration of the city of Caesarea. Eusebius is reported to have been jealous of Basil's quickly developed reputation and influence. He allowed Basil to return to his earlier solitude. Later, however, Gregory persuaded him to return, and Basil became the administrator for the Diocese of Caesarea.

In 370, Eusebius died. Basil was chosen to succeed him and was consecrated as a bishop on 14 June 370. His new post as Bishop of Caesarea also gave him the powers of exarch of Pontus and metropolitan of five suffragan bishops, many of whom had opposed him in the election for Eusebius's successor. It was then that his great powers were called into action. Hot-blooded and somewhat imperious, Basil was also generous and sympathetic. He personally organized a soup kitchen and distributed food to the poor during a famine following a drought.

His letters show that he actively worked to reform thieves and prostitutes. They also show him encouraging his clergy not to be tempted by wealth or the comparatively easy life of a priest and taking care in selecting worthy candidates for holy orders. He also had the courage to criticize public officials who failed in their duty of administering justice. At the same time, he preached every morning and evening in his own church to large congregations. In addition to all the above, he built a large complex just outside Caesarea, called the Basiliad, which included a poorhouse, hospice, and hospital. It was compared by Gregory of Nazianzus to the wonders of the world.

His zeal for orthodoxy did not blind him to what was good in an opponent; and for the sake of peace and charity, he was content to waive the use of orthodox terminology when it could be surrendered without a sacrifice of truth. The Emperor Valens, who was an adherent of the Arian philosophy, sent his prefect Modestus to at least agree to a compromise with the Arian faction. Basil's adamant negative response prompted Modestus to say that no one had ever spoken to him in that way before. Basil replied, "Perhaps you have never yet had to deal with a bishop." Modestus reported back to Valens that he believed nothing short of violence would avail against Basil. Valens was apparently unwilling to engage in violence. He did however issue orders banishing Basil repeatedly, none of which succeeded. Valens came himself to attend when Basil celebrated the Divine Liturgy on the Feast of the Theophany (Epiphany), and at that time was so impressed by Basil that he donated to him some land for the building of the Basiliad. This interaction helped to define the limits of governmental power over the church.

Basil then had to face the growing spread of Arianism. This belief system, which denied that Christ was consubstantial with the Father, was quickly gaining adherents and was seen by many, particularly those in Alexandria most familiar with it, as posing a threat to the unity of the church. Basil entered into connections with the West, and with the help of Athanasius, he tried to overcome its distrustful attitude toward the Homoiousians. The difficulties had been enhanced by bringing in the question as to the essence of the Holy Spirit. Although Basil advocated objectively the consubstantiality of the Holy Spirit with the Father and the Son, he belonged to those, who, faithful to Eastern tradition, would not allow the predicate homoousios to the former; for this he was reproached as early as 371 by the Orthodox zealots among the monks, and Athanasius defended him.

Basil corresponded with Pope Damasus in the hope of having his aid and encouragement against triumphant Arianism; the pope, however, cherished some degree of suspicion against the Cappadocian Doctor.

== Death and legacy ==
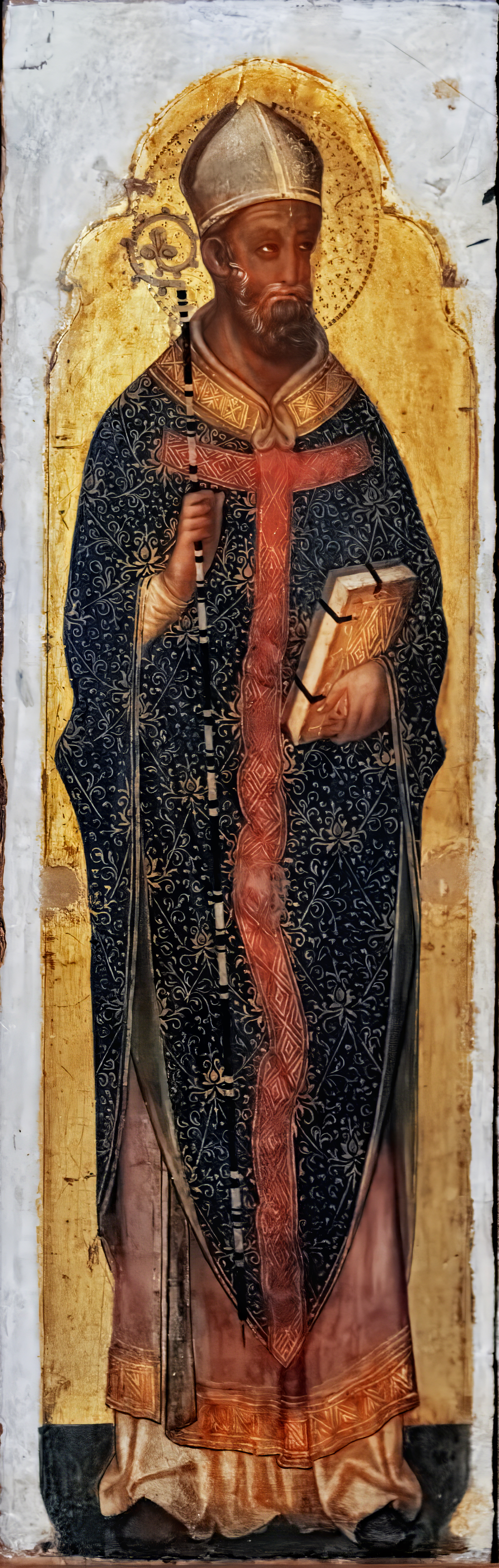
Basil of Caesarea Correr Museum Venice

Basil died before the factional disturbances ended. He suffered from liver disease; excessive ascetic practices also contributed to his early demise. Historians disagree about the exact date Basil died. The great institute before the gates of Caesarea, the Ptochoptopheion, or "Basileiad", which was used as poorhouse, hospital, and hospice became a lasting monument of Basil's episcopal care for the poor. Many of St. Basil's writings and sermons, specifically on the topics of money and possessions, continue to influence modern Christianity.

== Writings ==
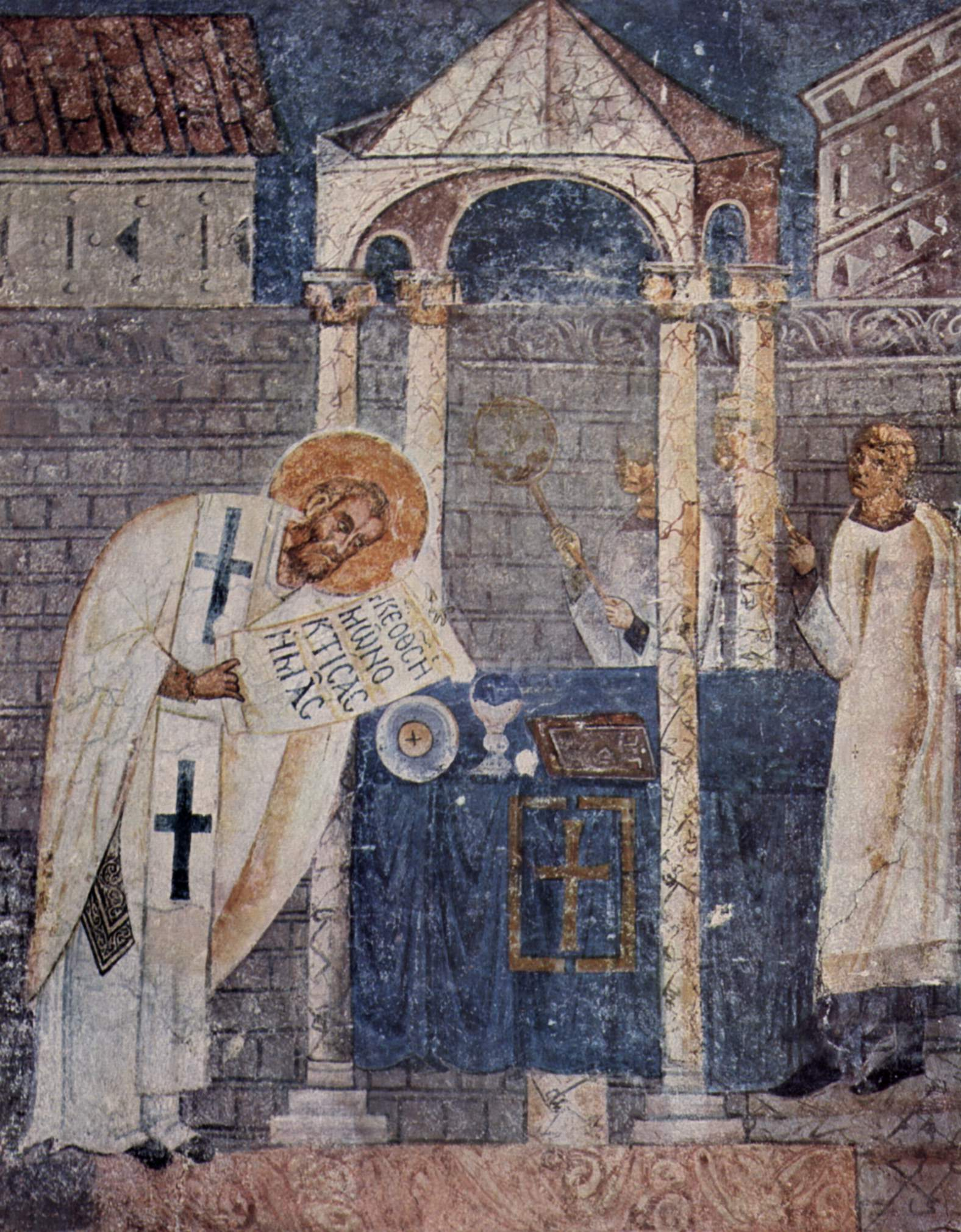
11th-century fresco of Basil the Great in the cathedral of Ohrid, showing the saint as a priest during the Divine Liturgy

The principal theological writings of Basil are his On the Holy Spirit, an appeal to Scripture and early Christian tradition to prove the divinity of the Holy Spirit, and his Refutation of the Apology of the Impious Eunomius, which was written about in 364 and comprised three books against Eunomius of Cyzicus, the chief exponent of Anomoian Arianism. The first three books of the Refutation are his work; his authorship of the fourth and fifth books is generally considered doubtful.

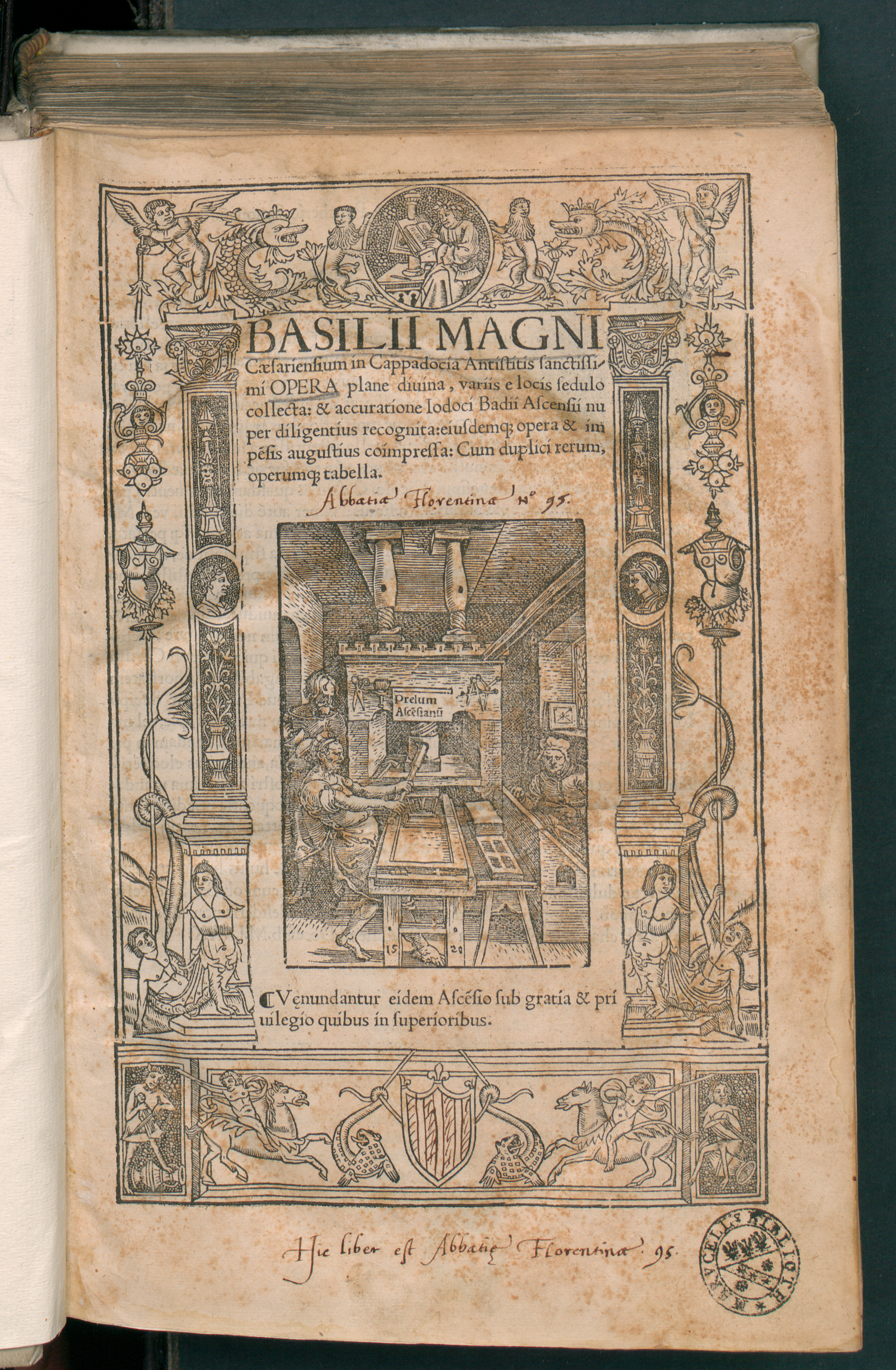
Title page of Basilii Magni Opera (1523), a translation of the writings of Basil the Great into Latin

He was a famous preacher, and many of his homilies, including a series of Lenten lectures on the Hexaemeron (also Hexaëmeros, lit. 'Six Days of Creation'; Latin: Hexameron), and an exposition of the psalter, have been preserved. Some, like that against usury and that on the famine in 368, are valuable for the history of morals; others illustrate the honour paid to martyrs and relics; the address to young men on the study of classical literature shows that Basil was influenced by his own education, which taught him to appreciate the propaedeutic importance of the classics. In one of his Homilies, he describes, in one of the earliest descriptions of desalination, how sailors in his time obtain fresh water by hanging sponges over a vessel with boiling seawater and collecting and condensing the water vapour.

In his exegesis Basil was an admirer of Origen and the need for the spiritual interpretation of Scripture. In his work on the Holy Spirit, he asserts that "to take the literal sense and stop there, is to have the heart covered by the veil of Jewish literalism. Lamps are useless when the sun is shining." He frequently stresses the need for Reserve in doctrinal and sacramental matters. At the same time, he expressed reservations against the use of overly speculative allegorations of some contemporaries. Concerning this, he wrote:

"I know the laws of allegory, though less by myself than from the works of others. There are those, truly, who do not admit the common sense of the Scriptures, for whom water is not water, but some other nature, who see in a plant, in a fish, what their fancy wishes, who change the nature of reptiles and of wild beasts to suit their allegories, like the interpreters of dreams who explain visions in sleep to make them serve their own end."

His ascetic tendencies are exhibited in the Moralia and Asketika (sometimes mistranslated as Rules of St. Basil), ethical manuals for use in the world and the cloister, respectively. There has been a good deal of discussion concerning the authenticity of the two works known as the Greater Asketikon and the Lesser Asketikon.

According to Orosius, Basil taught apocatastasis entailing the restoration of all sinners to Christ after purification. This doctrine is most evident in his Commentary on Isaiah, although there is some scholarly dispute whether this commentary should truly be attributed to him. On the other hand, Basil vehemently opposed the view that hell has an end in his short Regulae, even claiming that the many people who hold it are deceived by the devil. However, the notion of a finite hell was also espoused by his siblings Macrina and Gregory of Nyssa and potentially by his dear friend Gregory of Nazianzus, which is one of the reasons to think that the relevant passage in Regulae was interpolated. The passage also seems to include ideas that could be considered in opposition to ideas in Basil's undisputed writings, for example the notion of physical punishments in hell and of hell itself as a physical place with different locations. It is potentially in contradiction to most of Basil's linguistic use as well.

In his book De Spiritu Sancto, Basil lists some who for him are illustrious men of the church and quotes them; these are Irenaeus of Lyon, Clement of Rome, Dionysius of Rome, Dionysius of Alexandria, Eusebius, Julius Africanus, Gregory Thaumaturgus, Firmilian and Origen.

Basil also stresses the complete equality of both genders, deriving from the same human 'lump' (φύραμα, phyrama), both in the image of God, endowed with the same honour and dignity (ὁμοτίμως, homotimos), in perfect equality (ἐξ ἴσου, ex isou). Men even risk being inferior in piety (Homily on Julitta 241B). Likewise, in Homilies on Psalms 1, PG 29.216–17, he insists that man and woman have 'one and the same virtue' and 'one and the same nature' (φύσις, physis). Their common creation was of equal honour and dignity (ὁμότιμος, homotimos); they have the same capacity and activity (ἐνέργεια, energeia), and will be given the same reward. Similarly, in Letter to Amphilochius 188, Basil again uses ex isou (ἐξ ἴσου) in reference to the equality of women and men.

Basil faced the slavery issue in De Spiritu Sancto 20 in the context of a Trinitarian debate. Basil recognizes that no human is "a slave by nature". This principle countered Aristotle's conviction and was consistent with Gregory of Nyssa's view and with that of many other patristic thinkers; even Augustine and Theodoret conceded this. Basil, indeed, viewed slavery as a result of the Fall, a principle that was shared by Augustine, Theodoret, and many other Fathers. Sometimes slavery is a boon to the enslaved person, Basil maintained (in Moral Rules 75 he recommended, that Christian slaves work harder than non-Christian slaves). This view is opposed to Gregory of Nyssa, and is reminiscent of Aristotle's argument and of Theodoret's.

It is in the ethical manuals and moral sermons that the practical aspects of his theoretical theology are illustrated. So, for example, it is in his Sermon to the Lazicans that we find Basil explaining how it is our common nature that obliges us to treat our neighbour's natural needs (e.g., hunger, thirst) as our own, even though he is a separate individual.

Basil's three hundred letters reveal his character. They show his observant nature, which, despite the troubles of ill-health and ecclesiastical unrest, remained optimistic, tender and even playful. Basil is honoured as the chief architect of monastic life in the Greek Church.

Most of his extant works, and a few spuriously attributed to him, are available in the Patrologia Graeca, which includes Latin translations of varying quality. Several of Basil's works appeared in the late twentieth century in the Sources Chrétiennes collection.

A famous quote of Basil is the below:

The bread you store belongs to the hungry. The clothes you accumulate belong to the naked. The shoes that you have in your closet are for the barefoot. The money you bury deep into the ground to keep it safe, belongs to the poor. You were unfair to as many people as you could have helped and you did not.

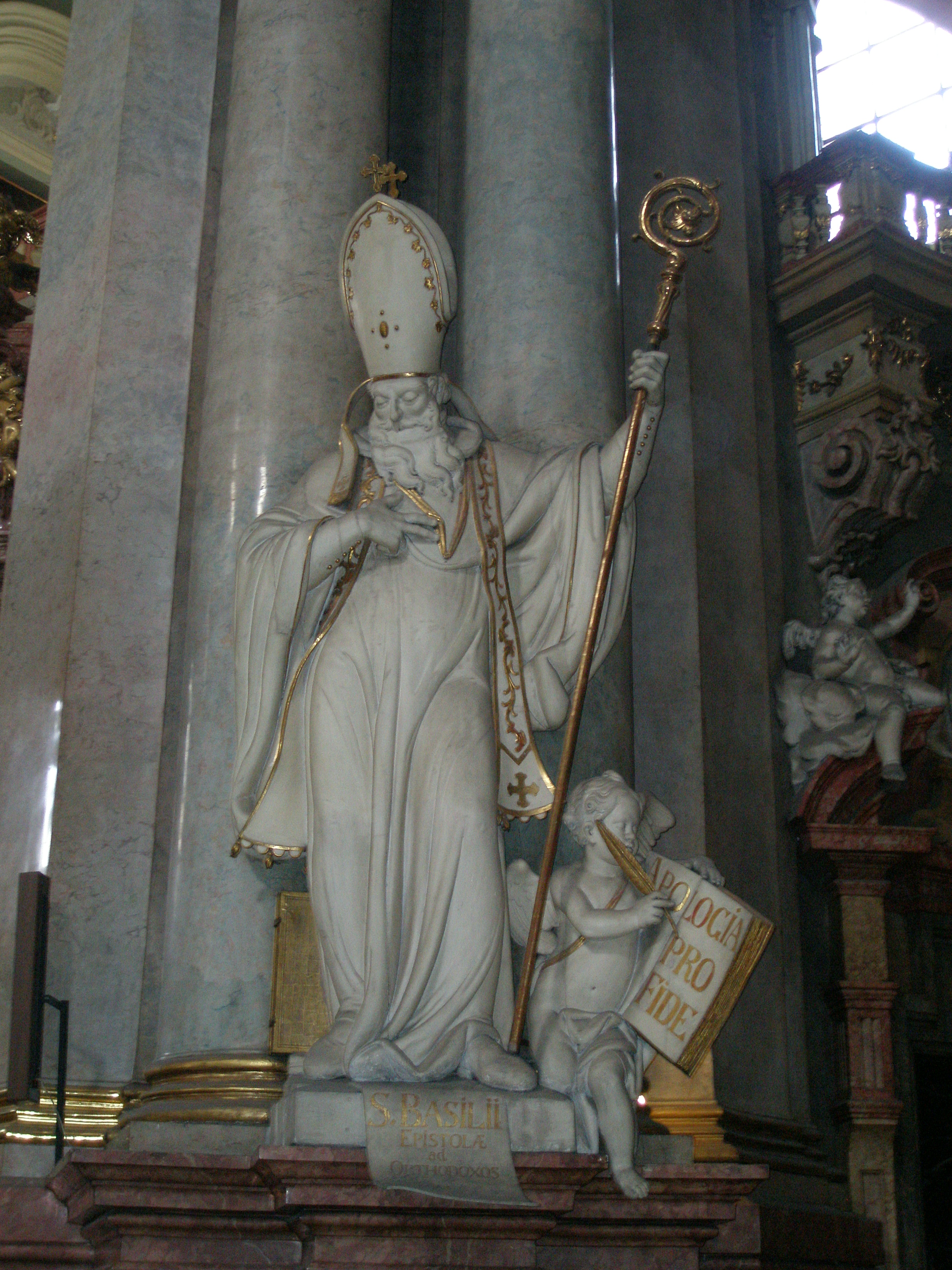
Statue of Saint Basil, depicting him in the vestments of a Roman Catholic bishop, at the 18th-century Church of St. Nicholas in Prague, Czech Republic

== Liturgical contributions ==
Basil of Caesarea holds a very important place in the history of Christian liturgy. Basil is known to have composed a liturgy by refining an existing liturgy; in addition to the constant tradition of the Byzantine Church there are many testimonies in ancient writings to establish the fact. Basil's liturgical influence is well-attested in early sources.

Most of the liturgies bearing the name of Basil are not entirely his work in their present form, but they nevertheless preserve a recollection of Basil's activity in this field in formularizing liturgical prayers and promoting church songs. Patristic scholars conclude that the Liturgy of Saint Basil "bears, unmistakably, the personal hand, pen, mind and heart of St. Basil the Great".

One liturgy that can be attributed to him is The Divine Liturgy of Saint Basil the Great, a liturgy that is somewhat longer than the more commonly used Divine Liturgy of St. John Chrysostom. The difference between the two is primarily in the silent prayers said by the priest, and in the use of the hymn to the Theotokos, All of Creation, instead of the Axion Estin of John Chrysostom's Liturgy.

The Eastern Churches preserve numerous other prayers attributed to Basil, including three prayers of exorcism, several morning and evening prayers, and the "Prayer of the Hours" which is read at each service of the Daily Office. One of the earliest Eucharistic prayers still in use in the Coptic Orthodox Church bears the name of St Basil and may have been brought to Egypt by Basil himself, who spent some time in Alexandria in 357.

== Influence on monasticism ==
Through his examples and teachings, Basil effected a noteworthy moderation in the austere practices which were previously characteristic of monastic life. He is also credited with coordinating the duties of work and prayer to ensure a proper balance between the two.

Basil is remembered as one of the most influential figures in the development of Christian monasticism. The Sayings of the Desert Fathers include one saying of Basil and both Barsanuphius and Dorotheus of Gaza refer to his rule. Not only is Basil recognized as the father of Eastern monasticism; historians recognize that his legacy extends also to the Western church, largely due to his influence on Benedict of Nursia. Patristic scholars such as Meredith assert that Benedict himself recognized this when he wrote in the epilogue to his Rule that his monks, in addition to the Bible, should read "the confessions of the Fathers and their institutes and their lives and the Rule of our Holy Father, Basil. Basil's teachings on monasticism, as encoded in works such as his Small Asketikon, were transmitted to the West via Rufinus during the late 4th century.

As a result of Basil's influence, numerous religious orders in Eastern Christianity bear his name. In the Roman Catholic Church, the Basilian Fathers, also known as the Congregation of St. Basil, an international order of priests and students studying for the priesthood, is named after him.

== Commemorations ==
Basil was given the title Doctor of the Church in the Western Church for his contributions to the debate initiated by the Arian controversy regarding the nature of the Trinity, and especially the question of the divinity of the Holy Spirit. Basil was responsible for defining the terms "ousia" (essence/substance) and "hypostasis" (person/reality), and for defining the classic formulation of three Persons in one Nature. His single greatest contribution was his insistence on the divinity and consubstantiality of the Holy Spirit with the Father and the Son.

In Greek tradition, Basil brings gifts to children every 1 January (St Basil's Day). It is traditional on St Basil's Day to serve vasilopita, a rich bread baked with a coin inside. The tradition is attributed to St. Basil, who when a bishop, wanted to distribute money to the poor and commissioned some women to bake sweetened bread, in which he arranged to place gold coins. Thus the families in cutting the bread were pleasantly surprised to find the coins.

It is customary on his feast day to visit the homes of friends and relatives, to sing New Year's carols, and to set an extra place at the table for Saint Basil. Basil, being born into a wealthy family, gave away all his possessions to the poor, the underprivileged, those in need, and children.

According to some sources, Basil died on 1 January, and the Eastern Orthodox Church celebrates his feast day together with that of the Feast of the Circumcision on that day. This was also the day on which the General Roman Calendar celebrated it at first; but in the 13th century it was moved to 14 June, a date believed to be that of his ordination as bishop, and it remained on that date until the 1969 revision of the calendar, which moved it to 2 January, rather than 1 January, because the latter date is occupied by the Solemnity of Mary, Mother of God. On 2 January Saint Basil is celebrated together with Saint Gregory Nazianzen. Novus Ordo services use the revised calendar while traditionalist Catholic communities continue to observe pre-1970 calendars.

The Lutheran Church–Missouri Synod commemorates Basil, along with Gregory of Nazianzus and Gregory of Nyssa, on 10 January.

The Church of England celebrates Saint Basil's feast (Lesser Festival) on 2 January, but the Episcopal Church and the Anglican Church of Canada celebrate it on 14 June.

In the Byzantine Rite, 30 January is the Synaxis of the Three Holy Hierarchs, in honor of Saint Basil, Saint Gregory the Theologian and Saint John Chrysostom. There is also a commemoration on 19 January for the miracle performed by Saint Basil in the city of Nicaea.

The Coptic Orthodox Church of Alexandria celebrates the feast day of Saint Basil on the 6th of Tobi (6th of Terr on the Ethiopian calendar of the Ethiopian Orthodox Tewahedo Church). At present, this corresponds to 14 January (15 January during leap year.)

== See also ==
- Basilian monk
- Pseudo-Basil
