= Nome =

Nome may refer to:

== Country subdivision ==
- Nome (Egypt), an administrative division within ancient Egypt
- Nome (Greece), the administrative division immediately below the peripheries of Greece (Greek: νομός, romanized: nomós, pl. Greek: νομοί, romanized: nomoí)

== Places ==
=== United States ===
- Nome, Alaska
- Nome Census Area, Alaska
- Nome River, Alaska
- Cape Nome, Alaska
- Nome, North Dakota
- Nome, Texas

=== Other ===
- Nome Municipality, a municipality in Telemark county, Norway
- Nome, Queensland, Australia

== Other uses ==
- Nome (mathematics)
- Gnome, spelled Nome in the Oz books by L. Frank Baum
  - Nome King
- Characters in The Nome Trilogy by Terry Pratchett
- Characters in the video game Little Nightmares
- Nome (spiritual teacher) (born 1955)
- NOME, a Guangzhou-based multinational variety store chain founded in 2017

== See also ==
- Nom (disambiguation)
- Nomos (disambiguation)
