= Peter of Sebaste =

Christian bishop in Lesser Armenia (c. 340–391)

Saint Peter of Sebaste

Bishop
- Born: c. 340; Caesarea, Cappadocia (modern-day Kayseri, Turkey)
- Died: 391; Sebaste, Lesser Armenia (modern-day Sivas, Turkey)
- Venerated in: Eastern Orthodox Church; Roman Catholic Church Oriental Orthodox Church
- Canonized: Pre-congregation
- Feast: 9 January; 26 March (post-2001 Roman Catholic)

Peter of Sebaste (Greek: Πέτρος; c. 340 – 391) was a bishop, taking his usual name from the city of his bishopric, Sebaste in Lesser Armenia. He was the younger brother of Basil of Caesarea, Gregory of Nyssa, the famous Christian jurist Naucratius, and Macrina the Younger. He is also known as Peter of Sebasteia. Peter was not intellectually inferior to the more celebrated members of his family, but his genius "seems to have been rather practical than literary".

== Life ==
His parents were Basil and Emmelia of Caesarea-in-Cappadocia, who were banished for their faith in the reign of the Emperor Galerius Maximian, and fled into the deserts of Pontus. His grandmother was Macrina the Elder, who was instructed by Gregory Thaumaturgus. The youngest of ten, he was brother to Macrina the Younger and the two Cappadocian doctors, Basil of Caesarea and Gregory of Nyssa. Macrina, his eldest sister, exercised a great influence over his religious training, acting as his instructor and directing him toward the spiritual and ascetic life.

Renouncing the study of secular sciences, he devoted himself to meditation on the Bible and the cultivation of the religious life. Basil appears to have employed his brother as his confidential agent in some matters. Subsequently, he withdrew from active affairs, and resumed the life of a solitary ascetic. He assisted his sister and his mother in establishing their monastic community after his father's death. Peter became involved in the gradual transformation of his mother's household from a community of virgins to a cenobitic community of both women and men. For some years his brother Basil was his near neighbour on the other side of the Iris, where he had established a monastery for male ascetics, in the presidency of which Peter succeeded him when in 365 Basil was finally recalled to Caesarea by bp. Eusebius. Peter headed the male monastery while Macrina was responsible for the female community. When the provinces of Pontus and Cappadocia were visited by a severe famine, he gave a remarkable proof of his charity, liberally disposing of all that belonged to his monastery, and whatever he could raise, to supply with necessaries the numerous crowds that daily resorted to him, in that time of distress. Shortly after his brother's elevation to the episcopal See of Caesarea in 370, Peter received from him priestly ordination. He continued to reside in his monastery till after Basil and Macrina died in 378/379.

About 380 he was elevated to the See of Sebaste in Armenia and took his stand beside his brothers Basil and Gregory in their fight against Arianism. In his life and episcopal administration he displayed the same characteristics as Basil. Linked together in the closest manner with his brothers, he followed their writings with the greatest interest. At his advice Gregory of Nyssa wrote his great work, Against Eunomius, in defense of Basil's similarly named book answering the polemical work of Eunomius. It was also at his desire that Gregory wrote the Treatise on the Work of the Six Days, to defend Basil's similar treatise against false interpretations and to complete it. Another work of Gregory's, On the Endowment of Man, was also written at Peter's suggestion and sent to the latter with an appropriate preface as an Easter gift in 397.

No detailed information is available concerning his activity as a bishop, except that he was present at the Ecumenical Council of Constantinople in 381. Olympias, the deaconess and friend of Chrysostom, entrusted large funds to him for distribution to the poor. After his death in 391 he was venerated as a saint. His feast was historically kept by Roman Catholics on 9 January, but he is now listed under 26 March in the second edition of the Roman Martyrology (2004).
