= Macrina the Younger =

Roman consecrated virgin (c.327–379)

Saint Macrina the Younger
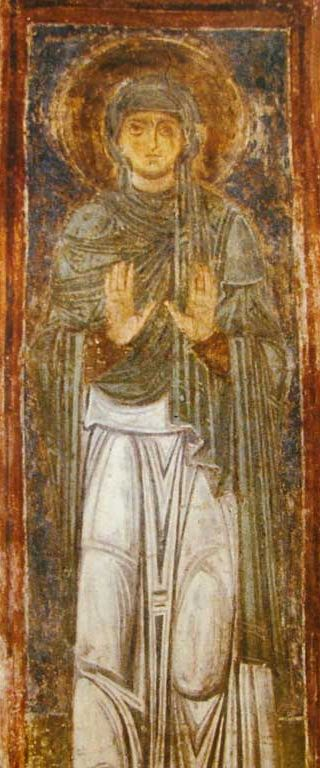

Virgin
- Born: c. 327; Caesarea, Cappadocia (modern-day Kayseri, Turkey)
- Died: 19 July 379; Pontus (modern-day Anatolia, Turkey)
- Venerated in: Eastern Orthodox Church; Oriental Orthodoxy; Roman Catholic Church; Anglican Communion; Lutheranism
- Feast: 19 July; 14 June (with Basil the Great, Gregory of Nyssa and Gregory Nazianzus; Lutheranism)
- Patronage: Virgins, monastics, theologians, educators, students of scripture

Macrina the Younger (Greek: Μακρίνα; c. 327 – 19 July 379) was an early Christian consecrated virgin. Macrina was elder sister of Basil the Great, Gregory of Nyssa, Naucratius and Peter of Sebaste. Gregory of Nyssa wrote a work entitled Life of Macrina in which he describes her sanctity and asceticism throughout her life. Macrina lived a chaste and humble life, devoting her time to prayer and the spiritual education of her younger brother Peter.

Macrina is regarded as a saint in the Roman Catholic, Eastern Orthodox, Oriental Orthodox and Anglican churches. She is sometimes referred to as Macrina the Teacher, especially by her brother Gregory.

== Family ==
Macrina was born at Caesarea, Cappadocia. Her parents were Basil the Elder and Emmelia, and her grandmother was Macrina the Elder. Among her nine siblings were two of the three Cappadocian Fathers, her younger brothers Basil the Great and Gregory of Nyssa, as well as Peter of Sebaste and the famous Christian jurist Naucratius. Her father arranged for her to marry, but her fiancé died before the wedding. After having been betrothed, Macrina did not believe it was appropriate to marry another man, but saw Christ as her eternal bridegroom.

Macrina had a profound influence on her brothers and her mother with her adherence to an ascetic ideal. In Gregory of Nyssa's Life of Macrina he remembers her as a child who was devoted to study of the scriptures, especially the Wisdom of Solomon, and those parts of it which have an ethical bearing, "such parts as you would think were incomprehensible to young children were the subject of the girl's studies".

Macrina, who resolved never to leave her mother, moved with her to one of their rural estates and lived within a community of virgins who came from both an aristocratic and a non-aristocratic background. All members were free, and slaves got the same rights and obligations as their masters. The death of the brother Naucratius shocked her mother and gave to Macrina a priority role in the domestic life.

In 379, Macrina died at her family's estate in Pontus, which with the help of her younger brother Peter she had turned into a convent of virgins. Gregory of Nyssa composed a Dialogue on the Soul and Resurrection (peri psyches kai anastaseos), entitled ta Makrinia (P.G. XLVI, 12 sq.), to commemorate Macrina, in which Gregory purports to describe the conversation he had with the dying Macrina, in a literary form modelled on Plato's Phaedo. It was a work that represented one of the very rare philosophical dialogues in which a woman is the protagonist. Even when dying, Macrina continued to live a life of sanctity, as she refused a bed, and instead chose to lie on the ground. Her feast day is 19 July.

== Legacy ==
Macrina is significant in that she set the standard for being a holy Early Christian woman. She contributed to her brother's writings and his belief that virginity reflected the "radiant purity of God".

Universalists, including Thomas Allin and J. W. Hanson, claim Macrina as a committed universalist, citing passages from the Dialogue on the Soul and Resurrection which they believe demonstrate her conviction that all sinners and demons will at last be purified and confess Christ. This claim to her Universalism is questionable, due to her plea for Election to Salvation at the end of her life. This suggests a more nuanced Eschatology, such as the Universal Reconciliation of Maximus the Confessor.

Macrina is honored in the Church of England and in the Episcopal Church on 19 July.

== See also ==
- Macrina the Younger, patron saint archive

== Sources ==
=== Primary sources ===
- Gregory of Nyssa, Life of Macrina, limovia.net, London, 2012. ISBN 978-1-78336-017-8
- Gregory of Nyssa, "On the Soul and the Resurrection"
- Saint Gregory of Nyssa: The Life of Saint Makrina and On Virginity. Translated by W.K. Lowther Clarke; W. Moore; H.A. Wilson. SAGOM Press. 2019. ISBN 978-1-945699-05-4.

=== Secondary sources ===
- Bear, Carl (2014). "Funeral Music in Early Christianity". Cross Accent. 22 (3): 4–14.
- Burrus, Virginia (2005). "Macrina's Tattoo". In Martin, Dale B.; Miller, P. Cox (eds.). The Cultural Turn in Late Ancient Studies: Gender, Asceticism, and Historiography. Durham: University of North Carolina Press. pp. 103–116.
- Burrus, Virginia (2001). "Is Macrina a Woman? Gregory of Nyssa's Dialogue on the Soul and Resurrection". In Ward, Graham (ed.). The Blackwell Companion to Postmodern Theology. Malden: Blackwell. pp. 249–264.
- Dury, John L. (2005). "Gregory of Nyssa's Dialogue with Macrina: The Compatibility of Resurrection of the Body and the Immortality of the Soul". Theology Today. 62 (2): 210–222. doi:10.1177/004057360506200206.
- Frank, Georgia (2000). "Macrina's Scar: Homeric Allusions and Heroic Identity in Gregory of Nyssa's Life of Macrina". Journal of Early Christian Studies. 8 (4): 511–530. doi:10.1353/earl.2000.0063.
- Helleman, Wendy (2001). "Cappadocian Macrina as Lady Wisdom". Studia Patristica. Louvain: Peeters. pp. 86–102.
- Herbermann, Charles, ed. (1913). "St. Macrina the Younger" . Catholic Encyclopedia. New York: Robert Appleton Company.
- Hotz, Kendra G. (2011). "Speaking Funk: Womanist Insights into the Lives of Syncletica and Macrina". In Holmes, Emily A.; Farley, Wendy (eds.). Women, Writing, Theology: Transforming a Tradition of Exclusion. Waco: Baylor University Press. pp. 71–94.
- Jallistos, Metr; Townsend, Ralph (1984). "The House of St Gregory and St Macrina: The First Quarter Century". Sobornost. 6 (2): 55–63.
- Johnson, Maria P. (1998). "Daughter, Sister, Philosopher, Angel: The Life and Influence of St Macrina the Younger". Diakonia. 31 (3): 176–186.
- Levering, Matthew (2017). "The Dying of Macrina and Death with Dignity". Trinity Journal. 38 (1): 29–52.
- McDonald, Durstan (1998). "Macrina: The Fourth Capadocian?". In Allen, Pauline (ed.). Prayer and Spirituality in the Early Church. Vol. 1. Everton Park: Australian Catholic University Press. pp. 367–373.
- McNary-Zak, Bernadette (2005). "Gregory of Nyssa and His Sister Macrina: A Holy Alliance". Cithara. 45 (1): 3–12.
- Muehlberger, Ellen (2012). "Salvage: Macrina and the Christian Project of Cultural Reclamation". Church History. 81 (2): 273–297. doi:10.1017/S0009640712000601.
- Pranger, M. B. (1997). "Narrative Dimensions in Gregory of Nyssa's Life of Macrina". Studia Patristica. Louvain: Peeters.
- Rousseau, Philip (2005). "The Pious Household and the Virgin Chorus". Journal of Early Christian Studies. 13 (2): 165–186. doi:10.1353/earl.2005.0027.
- Sheather, Mary (1995). "The Eulogies on Macrina and Gorgonia: Or, What Difference Did Christianity Make?". Pacfica. 8 (1): 22–39. doi:10.1177/1030570X9500800104.
- Silvas, Anna M. (2008). Macrina the Younger. Philosopher of God. Turnhout: Brepols. ISBN 978-2-503-52390-3.
- Smith, J. Warren (2005). "A Just and Reasonable Grief: The Death and Function of a Holy Woman in Gregory of Nyssa's Life of Macrina". Journal of Early Christian Studies. 13 (2): 57–84.
- Smith, J. Warren. (2001). "Macrina, Tamer of Horses and Healer of Souls: Grief and the Therapy of Hope in Gregory of Nyssa's De Anima et Resurrectione". Journal of Theological Studies. 52 (1): 37–60. doi:10.1093/jts/52.1.37.
- Van Loveran, A. E. D. (1982). "Once Again: 'The Monk and the Martyr': St Anthony and St Macrina". Studia Patristica. Elmsford: Pergamon Press. pp. 528–538.
- Wilson-Kastner, Patricia (1979). "Macrina: Virgin and Teacher". Andrews University Seminary Studies. 17 (1): 105–117.
