= Basil the Elder =

Roman saint

Basil the Elder (Greek: Βασιλείος ό Γέρος), father of Basil the Great, was raised in Caesarea Mazaca (in modern-day Turkey) in the Pontus. He died in the year 350, and his feast day is 30 May.

== Life ==
The son of Macrina the Elder, Basil is said to have moved with his family to the shores of the Black Sea during the persecution of Christians under Galerius. He is said to have been a well known lawyer and rhetorician, noted for his virtue. He married into the wealthy family of his wife Emmelia, and settled in Caesarea. There, he and his wife, with the help of his mother, raised a family that would greatly influence Christian history. Of their nine children (other sources claim ten children), five of them are remembered by name and are considered to be saints: Basil the Great, Gregory of Nyssa, Peter of Sebaste, Naucratius, and Macrina the Younger. After his death, his family property was converted into a monastic community for female virgins.
