= Thomas Allin (Anglican) =

Anglo-Irish clergyman

Thomas Allin (1838–1909) was an Anglo-Irish clergyman, a writer on Universalism, also known for botanical research.

== Life ==
He was born at Midleton, County Cork, Ireland. He graduated B.A. at Trinity College, Dublin in 1859, and took orders in the Church of Ireland. After a succession of curacies, he left for England in 1877.

== Works ==
- Universalism Asserted (1885 (1st ed.) - 1905 (9th ed.)) (First edition published under title: The question of questions. Some subsequent editions, including Robin Parry's 2015 edition, had the title Christ Triumphant or Universalism Asserted.)- J. W. Hanson recounts that this work started when Allin found a copy of Hosea Ballou's history of Universalism in the British Library and was led to a study of patristic literature.

- rewritten by Mark T. Chamberlain, "Every Knee Shall Bow", privately published.

- Race and Religion: Hellenistic Theology: its Place in Christian Thought 1899
- The Augustinian Revolution in Theology (1911, edited by J. J. Lias) "Augustine, as I shall try to show, and always on the authority of his own writings, was in very truth the greatest revolutionary of primitive times. By sheer force of genius and strength of will, he deflected and darkened the whole course of Christian thought in the West. He left Latin Christendom, at his death, the dreadful legacy of belief in an angry and cruel Deity, at whose feet the whole human family lay in terror;"

In his activity as naturalist he had Isaac Carroll (1828–1880) as collaborator. His surveys resulted in The Flowering Plants and Ferns of the County Cork (1883)
