= Infallibility =

Inability to be wrong

Infallibility refers to unerring judgment, being absolutely correct in all matters and having an immunity from being wrong in even the smallest matter. It can be applied within a specific domain, or it can be used as a more general adjective. The term has significance in religion, epistemology and theology, and its meaning and significance in both fields is the subject of continued debate.

== In philosophy ==
Epistemology, a branch of philosophy, is concerned with the question of what, if anything, humans can know. The answer to the issue of whether or not a human can be infallible depends on the philosophical school.

- Advocates of philosophical skepticism claim that one cannot know anything with certainty, much less be infallible.
- Infallibilists hold that knowledge requires absolute certainty, in the sense that if one knows that something is true, it is impossible that it could have turned out to be false.
- Advocates of subjectivism claim that there is no objective reality or truth, and therefore anyone can be considered infallible, since whatever is within a person's consciousness is considered the real and the true.
- Advocates of reason and rationality claim that one can gain certainty of knowledge, through a process of extreme refinement measures unlikely to be perfected enough for someone to assurably say "certainty of this knowledge is absolute", yet also assume by chance that one could land on the objective without the knowledge being confidently described as "universally certain", thus as a result, advocates tend to avoid this altogether and instead rely upon Occam's Razor as a suitable means for obtaining knowledge.

== In theology ==
=== Christianity ===
The Oxford Dictionary of the Christian Church defines infallibility as "Inability to err in teaching revealed truth". Catholic and Eastern Orthodox theology claim that the Church is infallible, but disagree as to where infallibility exists, whether in doctrines, scripture, or church authorities.

In Catholic theology, Jesus, who is the Truth, is infallible, but only a special act of teaching by the church's bishops may properly be called "infallible". According to the First Vatican Council (1869–1871) and as reaffirmed at Vatican II (1962–1965), the earthly head of the Catholic Church, the Pope, is infallible when speaking ex cathedra on matters of faith and morals (that is, when he explicitly intends to use his papal office to teach the whole Church definitively and irreformably on matters which deal directly with faith and morals). However, papal infallibility does not extend beyond such cases, thus making it possible for a Pope to sin and to be incorrect. Papal infallibility also belongs to the body of bishops as a whole, when, in doctrinal unity with the pope, they solemnly teach a doctrine as true.

In contrast, Protestant and non-denominational Christian churches believe that the Christian Church is indeed fallible, as evidenced by the requirement of Christ's sacrifice on the cross to pay for the sins of the world, including those of his Church, and that only God's word in scripture is infallible. They also reject the Catholic claim regarding papal infallibility.

Some Protestant and non-denominational views confuse papal infallibility with impeccability, as if the Pope were immune from sin. This is not the Catholic Church's doctrine, which concedes that Popes can sin and may even contradict one another's personal theological opinions. It is evident that the Pope can sin (which every Pope explicitly states in the Confiteor, and whenever he receives the Sacrament of Penance) and a Pope may even succumb to heresy, as suggested in the condemnation by the Third Council of Constantinople (13th and 16th session) which anathematized Pope Honorius I for supporting the heresy of monothelitism, and which Pope John XXII admitted when he retracted his views on the beatific vision.

=== Islam ===
==== Universal teachings ====
Islam teaches that the teachings and guidance by the Prophets with regard to bringing the message of the One true God is infallible. Islam also teaches that the Quran is an infallible text.

==== Additional Shi'a teachings ====
In Shi'a theology, one of the two branches of Islam, the belief is that the Ahl al-Bayt, including Muhammad, his daughter Fatima Zahra and Shi'a Imams are all infallible. It is believed that they are infallible in the sense that all statements or teachings made by them can be relied on to be certainly true, that all information believed by themselves is true, and that they have complete knowledge about right and wrong and never intend to disobey God. It is also held by Shi'as that there were 124,000 Prophets, beginning with Adam and ending with Muhammad – with all, including the last, being infallible in the same sense as the Ahl al-Bayt.

=== Judaism ===
The notion of infallibility in Judaism as it relates to the Tannaim and Amoraim of the Talmud, as well as the Rishonim, Achronim and modern day Gedolim is one surrounded by debate.

Some who reject infallibility cite the Talmud, Pesachim 94b:

The sages of Israel say: "The sphere (Earth) remains fixed and the constellations revolve," while the sages of the nations say: "The sphere revolves and the constellations remain fixed." ... the sages of Israel say: "during the day the sun moves below the canopy (sky) and at night above the canopy," while the sages of the nations say: "during the day the sun moves below the canopy and at night below the ground." Rebbi said: "Their words seem more correct than ours..."

The words of the Mishnah are commented on by numerous commentators, and Yehuda Levi argues that the Geonim and Maimonides perceived that the sages of the Talmud "erred in a matter of astronomy". Maimonides wrote that the great sages are not expected to advocate positions perfectly in-line with modern science because they were "scholars of that generation," often basing their assessments of what "they learned from the scholars of the era."

=== Vaishnavism (Hinduism) ===
In the Bhagavad Gita, Krishna explains to Arjuna (Bg 15.16 to 15.20):

There are two classes of beings, the fallible and the infallible. In the material world every living entity is fallible, and in the spiritual world every living entity is called infallible. Besides these two, there is the greatest living personality, the Supreme Soul, the imperishable Lord Himself, who has entered the three worlds and is maintaining them. Because I am transcendental, beyond both the fallible and the infallible, and because I am the greatest, I am celebrated both in the world and in the Vedas as that Supreme Person. Whoever knows Me as the Supreme Personality of Godhead, without doubting, is the knower of everything. He therefore engages himself in full devotional service to Me, O son of Bharata. This is the most confidential part of the Vedic scriptures, O sinless one, and it is disclosed now by Me. Whoever understands this will become wise, and his endeavors will know perfection.

=== Baháʼí Faith ===
The Baháʼí Faith teaches the doctrine of the Most Great Infallibility (al-'ismah al-kubra) which applies to the Manifestations of God who founded the world's major religions, including Abraham, Krishna, Zoroaster, Moses, Buddha, Jesus Christ, Muhammad, as well as the Báb (1819–1850) and Baháʼu'lláh (1817–1892), the prophet-founder of the faith.

Infallibility also extends to ʻAbdu'l-Bahá (1844–1921), the son of the faith's founder; to the Guardian of the faith Shoghi Effendi (1897–1957); and to the Universal House of Justice, the faith's nine-member supreme ruling body.

In the Kitáb-i-Aqdas, the central religious text of the faith, Baháʼu'lláh describes himself as having "no partner in the Most Great Infallibility". He later expounds on the doctrine in the ʼIs͟hráqát, a tablet written circa 1885 to a believer from Azerbaijan.

ʻAbdu'l-Bahá described infallibility as being of two kinds: the "essential infallibility" of the Manifestations of God, and the "acquired infallibility" of the Guardian and the Universal House of Justice.

In the Will and Testament of ʻAbdu'l-Bahá, he describes both the Guardian and the Universal House of Justice as being "under the care and protection of the Abhá Beauty, under the shelter and unerring guidance of the Exalted One":

Whatsoever they decide is of God. Whoso obeyeth him not, neither obeyeth them, hath not obeyed God; whoso rebelleth against him and against them hath rebelled against God; whoso opposeth him hath opposed God; whoso contendeth with them hath contended with God; whoso disputeth with him hath disputed with God; whoso denieth him hath denied God; whoso disbelieveth in him hath disbelieved in God; whoso deviateth, separateth himself and turneth aside from him hath in truth deviated, separated himself and turned aside from God. May the wrath, the fierce indignation, the vengeance of God rest upon him!

Shoghi Effendi describes the limits of the Guardian's infallibility as such:

The infallibility of the Guardian is confined to matters which are related strictly to the Cause and interpretation of the teachings; he is not an infallible authority on other subjects, such as economics, science, etc. When he feels that a certain thing is essential for the protection of the Cause, even if it is something that affects a person personally, he must be obeyed, but when he gives advice, such as that he gave you in a previous letter about your future, it is not binding; you are free to follow it or not as you please.
