= Gnomic will =

Concept in Eastern Orthodox theology

Gnomic will (Greek: Θἑλημα γνωμικόν, θέλησι γνωμική) is an Eastern Christian theological notion meaning spontaneous individual aspiration and movement of the mind.

== Overview ==
This notion belongs to Maximus the Confessor.

The term gnomic derives from the Greek gnome, meaning 'inclination, intention'. Within Orthodox theology, gnomic willing is contrasted with natural willing. Natural willing designates the movement of a creature in accordance with the principle (logos (Greek: λόγος)) of its nature towards the fulfilment (telos (Greek: τέλος)), stasis (Greek: στάσις)) of its being. Gnomic willing, on the other hand, designates that form of willing in which a person engages in a process of deliberation, culminating in a decision.

Within the theology of St. Maximus, which was endorsed by the Sixth Ecumenical Council in condemning monothelitism, Jesus Christ possessed no gnomic will. St. Maximus developed this claim, particularly in his Dialogue with Pyrrhus. According to St. Maximus, the process of gnomic willing presupposes that a person does not know what they want, so they must deliberate and choose between a range of choices. However, Jesus Christ, as both man and the second Person of the Trinity, possessed complete congruence of his two wills: the divine and the human. Therefore, St. Maximus reasoned that Jesus was never in a state of ignorance regarding what he wanted, and so he never engaged in gnomic willing.

Aristotle, a major philosophical influence on Maximus, in comparing the works of Nature with those of a human worker, had also declared that any process of deliberation, far from indicating superior intellect, is a sign of our weakness.

== See also ==
- Christian anthropology
- Deliberation
- Eastern Orthodox theology
- Neo-Chalcedonism
- Prohairesis

== Sources ==
- John Meyendorff. «Ecumenical World of Orthodox Civilization: Russia and Orthodoxy: Essays in Honor of Georges Florovsky» ed. A. Blane. The Hague; R: Mouton, 1973. Vol. 3./ P. 71–75
- Мейендорф И., прот. «Свободная воля (γνώμη) у преподобного Максима Исповедника»/ Разбивка страниц настоящей электронной статьи сделана по: протопресвитер Иоанн Мейендорф, «Пасхальная тайна. Статьи по богословию.», М., 2013.
- David Bradshaw, Ph.D. «St. Maximus the Confessor on the Will—Natural and Gnomic». Posted on 3 August 2016
- Archimandrite Irenei (Steenberg) «Maximos the Confessor: On the Free Will of Christ». February 3, 2016
- Paul M. Blowers. «Maximus the Confessor and John of Damascus on Gnomic Will (γνώμη) in Christ: Clarity and Ambiguity» / Emmanuel Christian Seminary / Johnson City, Tennessee
- Basil Lourié. «История византийской философии» / III. Ранневизантийское богословие / Богословский синтез VII века: святой Максим Исповедник и его эпоха / 4. Богословие святого Максима Исповедника / 4.2 Тропос существования и энергия природы / 4.2.6 Теория волевого акта: воля природная и воля гномическая
