= Naucratius =

Saint Naucratius (Greek: Ναυκράτιος) was the son of Basil the Elder and Emmelia of Caesarea. He was the younger brother of Macrina the Younger and Basil the Great, and an older brother of Gregory of Nyssa and Peter of Sebaste. He distinguished himself both in scholarship and Christian devotion, as an active hermit.

== Life ==
Most of what is known of Naucratius, is from his brother, Gregory of Nyssa's Life of Macrina:

The second of the four brothers, Naucratius by name, who came next after the great Basil, excelled the rest in natural endowments and physical beauty, in strength, speed and ability to turn his hand to anything. When he had reached his twenty-first year, and had given such a demonstration of his studies by speaking in public, that the whole audience in the theatre was thrilled, he was led by divine providence to despise all that was already in his grasp, and drawn by an irresistible impulse went off to a life of solitude and poverty. He took nothing with him but himself, save that one of the servants named Chrysapius followed him, because of the affection he had towards his master and the intention he had formed to lead the same life. So he lived by himself, having found a solitary spot on the banks of the Iris-a river flowing through the midst of Pontus. It rises actually in Armenia, passes through our parts, and discharges its stream into the Black Sea. By it the young man found a place with a luxuriant growth of trees and a hill nestling under the mass of the overhanging mountain. There he lived far removed from the noises of the city and the distractions that surround the lives both of the soldier and the pleader in the law courts. Having thus freed himself from the din of cares that impedes man's higher life, with his own hands he looked after some old people who were living in poverty and feebleness, considering it appropriate to his mode of life to make such a work his care. So the generous youth would go on fishing expeditions, and since he was an expert in every form of sport, he provided food to his grateful clients by this means.

Although a talented rhetorician, Naucratius abandoned that career in 352 to become a hermit not far from the family estate at Annesi. He undertook two tasks. The first was to care for his mother; the second, to provide for some elderly poor people who lived near him. He became a skilled hunter. Raymond Van Dam says that Naucratius's time in the wild recalled his grandparents, who, for a time, fled to the forests to avoid persecution.

For five years, Naucratius made every effort to ensure his mother was happy. Then, in 357, he and Chrysapius were killed in a hunting accident while on one of the expeditions, by which he provided necessaries for the old men under his care, . Naucratius's sudden death was a shock to the entire family. Basil returned from Athens either shortly before or shortly after the death of Naucratius. Anna Silvas suggests that it was the death of Naucratius that brought Basil home. That same year Basil moved to his own hermitage on the estate.

The Order of Naucratius is an organization in the Episcopal Diocese of Western Michigan that connects hunters and anglers who share their harvests with those who are hungry, through local programs and churches that are engaged in feeding people.
