= Gregory Thaumaturgus =

Greek bishop and saint (c. 213 – 270)

Saint Gregory of Neocaesarea
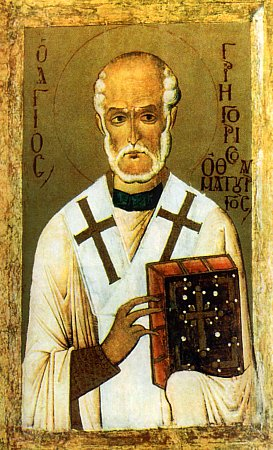
- Saint Gregory the Miracle-Worker; 14th century icon

Thaumaturgus (Miracle-worker) Bishop, Confessor and Equal to the Apostles
- Born: c. AD 213; Neocaesarea, Pontus (modern-day Niksar, Tokat, Turkey)
- Died: c. AD 270; Pontus (modern-day Turkey)
- Venerated in: Catholic Church; Eastern Orthodox Church; Oriental Orthodoxy
- Canonized: Pre-Congregation
- Major shrine: Calabria
- Feast: November 17; Saturday before first Sunday of Advent (Armenian Apostolic Church)
- Attributes: Bishop driving demons out of a temple; presenting a bishop's mitre to Saint Alexander the Charcoal Burner
- Patronage: Against earthquakes, desperate causes, floods, forgotten causes, impossible causes, lost causes

Gregory Thaumaturgus or Gregory the Miracle-Worker (Ancient Greek: Γρηγόριος ὁ Θαυματουργός, Grēgórios ho Thaumatourgós; Latin: Gregorius Thaumaturgus; c. 213 – c. 270), also known as Gregory of Neocaesarea, was a Christian bishop of the 3rd century. He has been canonized as a saint in the Catholic and Orthodox Churches.

== Biography ==
Gregory was born around AD 213 to a wealthy pagan family in Neocaesarea (modern Niksar, then the capital of the area of Pontus in Asia Minor). Little is known of his pastoral work, and his surviving theological writings are in an incomplete state. This lack of knowledge partially obscures his personality, despite his historical importance. His longstanding title Thaumaturgus, meaning "the wonder-worker" in Latinized Greek, casts an air of legend about him. Nevertheless, the lives of few bishops of the third century are so well authenticated; the historical references to him permit a fairly detailed reconstruction of his work.

Originally he was known as Theodore ("gift of God"), not an exclusively Christian name. He was introduced to the Christian religion at the age of fourteen, after the death of his father. He had a brother Athenodorus, and on the advice of one of their tutors, the young men were eager to study at the Berytus in Beirut, then one of the four or five famous schools in the Hellenic world. At this time, their brother-in-law was appointed assessor (legal counsel) to the Roman Governor of Palestine; the youths had therefore an occasion to act as an escort to their sister as far as Caesarea in Palestine. On arrival in that town they learned that the celebrated scholar Origen, head of the Catechetical School of Alexandria, resided there. Curiosity led them to hear and converse with the master. Soon both youths forgot all about Beirut and Roman law, and they gave themselves up to the great Christian teacher, who gradually won them over to Christianity.

In his panegyric on Origen, Gregory describes the method employed by that master to win the confidence and esteem of those he wished to convert, specifically, how he mingled a persuasive candour with outbursts of temper and theological argument put cleverly at once and unexpectedly. Persuasive skill rather than bare reasoning, evident sincerity, and an ardent conviction were the means Origen used to make converts. Gregory first studied philosophy, and theology was afterwards added. But his mind remained always inclined to philosophical study, so much so that in his youth he cherished strongly the hope of demonstrating that the Christian religion was the only true and good philosophy. For seven years, he studied under the mental and moral discipline of Origen (231 to 238 or 239). There is no reason to believe that his studies were interrupted by the persecutions of Maximinus of Thrace; his alleged journey to Alexandria, at this time, may therefore be considered at least doubtful and probably never occurred.

Before leaving Palestine, Gregory delivered a public farewell oration in presence of Origen in which he gave thanks to his illustrious master. This oration is valuable from many points of view. As a rhetorical exercise, it exhibits the excellent training given by Origen, and his skill in developing literary taste and the amount of adulation then permissible towards a living person in an assembly composed primarily of Christians. It contains, moreover, much useful information concerning the youth of Gregory and his master's method of teaching. A letter of Origen refers to the departure of the two brothers, but it is not easy to determine whether it was written before or after the delivery of this oration. In it, Origen exhorts his pupils to bring the intellectual treasures of the Greeks to the service of Christian philosophy, and thus imitate the Jews who employed the golden vessels of the Egyptians to adorn the Holy of Holies.

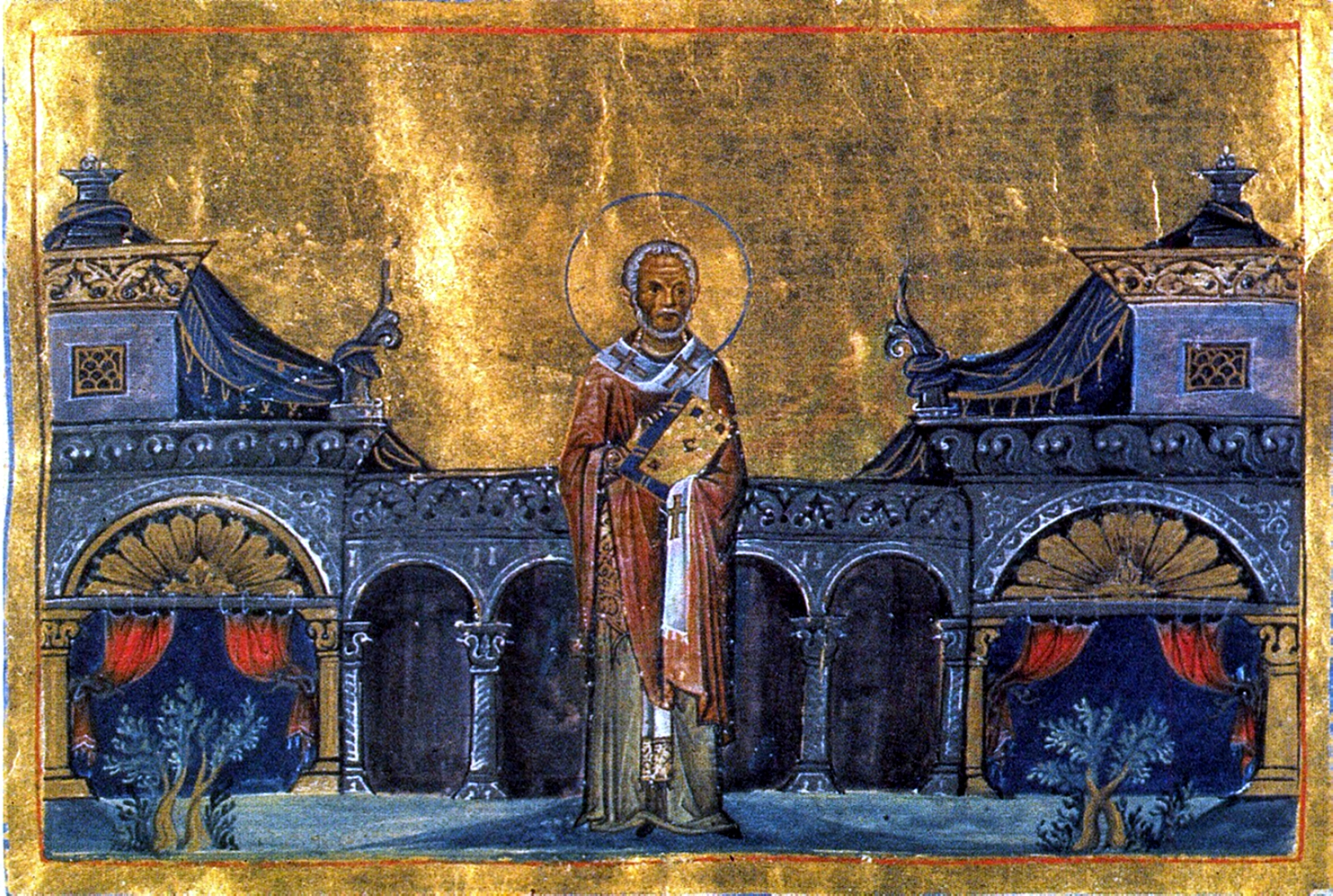
Miniature from the Menologion of Basil II

Gregory returned to Pontus with the intention of practising law. His plan, however, was again laid aside, for he was soon consecrated bishop of his native Neocaesarea by Phoedimus, Bishop of Amasea and metropolitan of Pontus. This fact illustrates in an interesting way the growth of the hierarchy in the primitive Church. The Christian community at Caesarea was very small, being only seventeen souls, and yet it was given a bishop. Ancient canonical documents indicate that it was possible for a community of even ten Christians to have their own bishop. When Gregory was consecrated he was forty years old, and he ruled his diocese for thirty years.

Nothing definite is known about his methods, but he must have shown much zeal in increasing the little flock with which he began his episcopal administration. He was wise, and people came to him for counsel. An ancient source attests to his missionary zeal by recording a curious coincidence: Gregory began with only seventeen Christians, but at his death, there remained only seventeen pagans in the whole town of Caesarea. Presumably the many miracles which won for him the title of Thaumaturgus were performed during these years.

== Historicity of life ==
Sources on the life, teaching, and actions of Gregory Thaumaturgus are all more or less open to criticism. Besides the details given by Gregory himself, there are four other sources of information, according to Kötschau all derived from oral tradition; indeed, the differences between them force the conclusion that they cannot all be derived from one common written source. They are:

- Life and Panegyric of Gregory by St. Gregory of Nyssa (P.G., XLVI, col. 893 sqq.);
- Historia Miraculorum, by Rufinus;
- an account in Syriac of the great actions of Blessed Gregory (sixth-century manuscript);
- St. Basil, De Spiritu Sancto.

Drawing on family traditions and a knowledge of the neighbourhood, the account by Gregory of Nyssa is more reliably historical than other known versions of the Thaumaturge's life. By the time of Rufinus (c. 400), the original story was becoming confused; the Syriac account is at times obscure and contradictory. Even the life by Gregory of Nyssa exhibits a legendary element, though the facts were supplied to the writer by his grandmother, St. Macrina the Elder. He relates that before his episcopal consecration Gregory retired from Neocaesarea into a solitude, and was favoured by an apparition of the Blessed Virgin and John the Apostle, and that the latter dictated to him a creed or formula of Christian faith, of which the autograph existed at Neocaesarea when the biography was being written. The creed itself is important for the history of Christian doctrine.

Gregory of Nyssa describes at length the miracles that gained for the Bishop of Caesarea the title of Thaumaturgus. It is clear that Gregory's influence must have been considerable, and his miraculous power undoubted. It might have been expected that Gregory's name would appear among those who took part in the First Council of Antioch against Paul of Samosata; probably he took part also in the second council held there against the same heresiarch, for the letter of that council is signed by a bishop named Theodore, which had been originally Gregory's name. To attract the people to the festivals in honour of the martyrs, Gregory organized profane amusements that might appeal to pagans, who were accustomed to religious ceremonies that combined solemnity with pleasure and merrymaking.

== Writings of Gregory ==
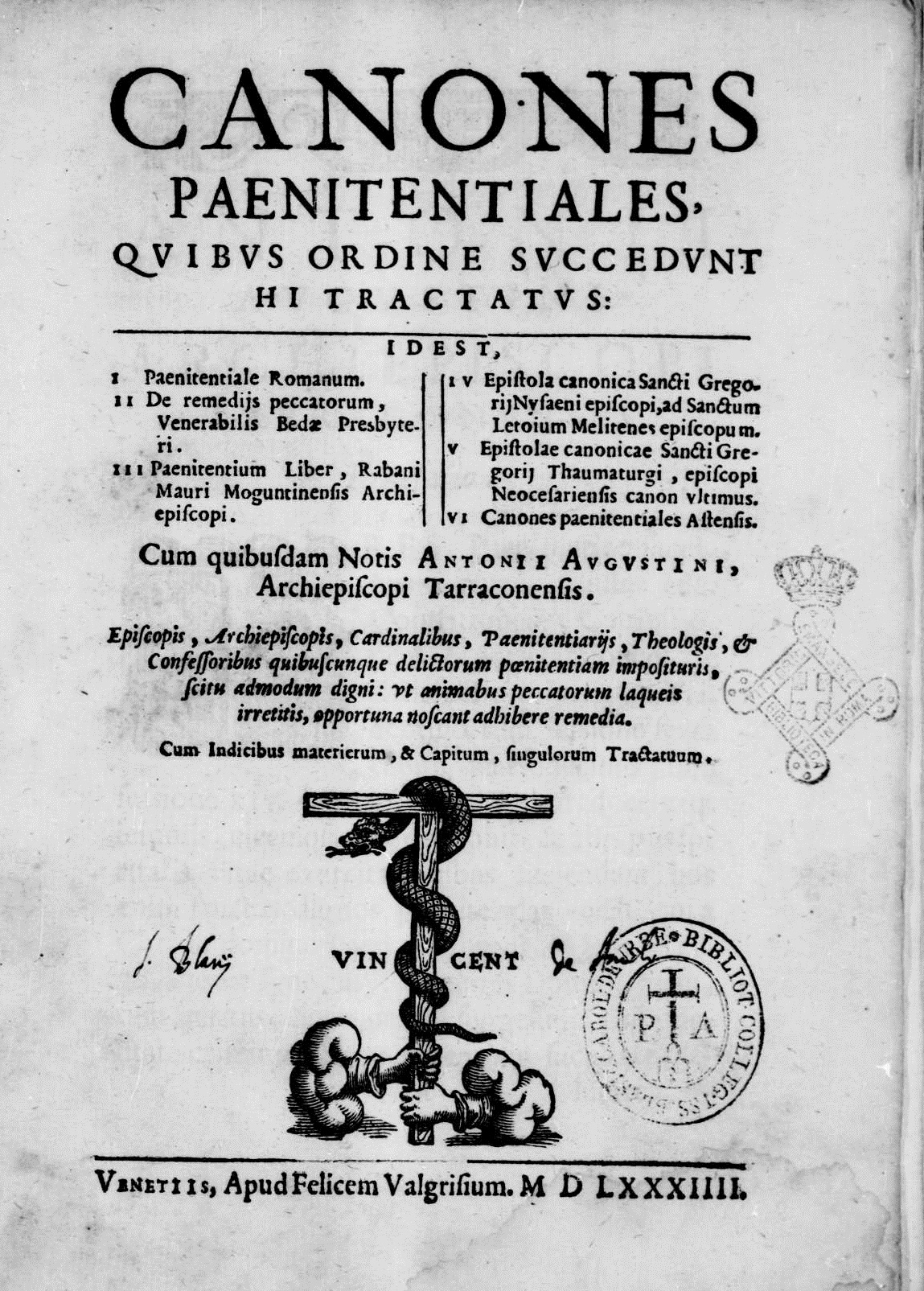
Canones paenitentiales, 1584 edition

=== Oratio Panegyrica ===
The Oratio Panegyrica in honour of Origen describes in detail that master's pedagogical methods. Its literary value consists less in its style than in its novelty: it is the first attempt at biography in Christian literature. This youthful work is full of enthusiasm and genuine talent; moreover, it proves how fully Origen had won the admiration of his pupils, and how the training Gregory received influenced the remainder of a long and well spent life.

Gregory tells us in this work (xiii) that under Origen he read the works of many philosophers, without restriction as to school, except that of the atheists. From this reading of the old philosophers he learned to insist frequently on the unity of God; and his long experience of pagan or crudely Christian populations taught him how necessary this was. Traces of this insistence are to be met with in the Tractatus ad Theopompum, concerning the passability and impassibility of God; this work seems to belong to Gregory, though in its general arrangement it reminds us of Methodius.

A similar trait was probably characteristic of the lost Dialogus cum Aeliano (Pros Ailianon Dialexis), which we learn of through St. Basil, who frequently attests the orthodoxy of the Thaumaturgus (Ep. xxviii, 1, 2; cciv, 2; ccvii, 4) and even defends him against the Sabellians, who claimed him for their teaching and quoted as his formula: patera kai ouion epinoia men einai duo, hypostasei de en (that the Father and the Son were two in intelligence, but one in substance) from the aforesaid Dialogus cum Aeliano. St. Basil replied that Gregory was arguing against a pagan, and used the words agonistikos not dogmatikos, i.e. in the heat of combat, not in calm exposition; in this case he was insisting, and rightly, on the Divine unity. He added, moreover, that a like explanation must be given to the words ktisma, poiema (created, made) when applied to the Son, reference being to Christ Incarnate. Basil added that the text of the work was corrupt.

=== Epistola Canonica ===
The Epistola Canonica (Ἐπιστολὴ κανονική) (Routh, Reliquiae Sacrae, III, 251–283) is valuable to both historians and canonists as evidence of the organization of the Church of Caesarea and the other Churches of Pontus under Gregory's influence, at a time when the invading Goths had begun to aggravate a situation made difficult enough by the imperial persecutions. We learn from this work how absorbing the episcopal charge was for a man of conscience and a strict sense of duty. Moreover, it helps us to understand how a man so well equipped mentally, and with the literary gifts of Gregory, has not left a greater number of works.

=== Exposition of the Faith ===
The Ἔκθεσις τῆς πίστεως (Exposition of the Faith) is in its kind a theological document not less precious than the foregoing. It makes clear Gregory's orthodoxy regarding the Trinity. Its authenticity and date seem settled definitively, between 260 and 270. Caspari has shown that this confession of faith is a development of the premises laid down by Origen. Its conclusion leaves no room for doubt, "There is therefore nothing created, nothing greater or less (literally, nothing subject) in the Trinity (oute oun ktiston ti, he doulon en te triadi), nothing superadded, as though it had not existed before, but never been without the Son, nor the Son without the Spirit; and this same Trinity is immutable and unalterable forever". Such a formula, stating clearly the distinction between the Persons in the Trinity, and emphasizing the eternity, equality, immortality, and perfection, not only of the Father, but of the Son and of the Holy Spirit, proclaims a marked advance on the theories of Origen.

=== Epistola ad Philagrium ===
The Epistola ad Philagrium has reached us in a Syriac version. It treats of the Consubstantiality of the Son and has also been attributed to Gregory of Nazianzus (Ep. ccxliii; formerly Orat. xiv); Tillemont and the Benedictines, however, deny this because it offers no expression suggestive of the Arian controversy. Draeseke, nevertheless, calls attention to numerous views and expressions in this treatise that recall the writings of Gregory of Nazianzus.

=== Other attributed works ===
A Metaphrasis eis ton Ekklesiasten tou Solomontos, or paraphrase of Ecclesiastes, is attributed to him by some manuscripts; others ascribe it to Gregory of Nazianzus; St. Jerome (De vir. illust., chapter 65, and Com. in eccles., iv) ascribes it to our Gregory.

The brief Treatise on the Soul addressed to one Tatian, in favour of which may be cited the testimony of Nicholas of Methone (probably from Procopius of Gaza), is now claimed for Gregory.

The Kephalaia peri pisteos dodeka or Twelve Chapters on Faith do not seem to be the work of Gregory. According to Caspari, the Kata meros pistis or brief exposition of doctrine concerning the Trinity and the Incarnation, attributed to Gregory, was composed by Apollinaris of Laodicea about 380, and circulated by his followers as a work of Gregory (Otto Bardenhewer).

Finally, the Greek, Syriac, and Armenian Catenæ contain fragments attributed more or less correctly to Gregory. The fragments of the De Resurrectione belong rather to Pamphilus' Apologia for Origen.

== Patronage ==
In medieval Bosnia, Sveti Grgur, or Saint Gregory the Miracle-Worker, spread through the rise of the new territorial church, the schismatic Bosnian Church, after the Catholic episcopal see had to move out from Bosnia to Đakovo, in the first half of the 13th century. This prompted Bosnians to search for a new confessional identity, so in a fully autonomous act, unrecognized by papacy at the time, Bosnian political and ecclesiastical hierarchy turned the saint, also known for his state-building role, into both the ruling Kotromanić dynasty and the state patron of the Bosnian Kingdom. Patronage of Saint Gregory the Miracle-Worker will eventually get its recognition by Pope Pius II, in late 1461. Meanwhile, the cult of St. Gregory, maintained by the Bosnian Church, will see another manifestation in Gregory of Nazianzus in the first half of the 15th century, which will change to Saint Gregory the Great with King Thomas' conversion to Catholicism in late 1440s early 1450s. St. Gregory, in these three iteration, has been the patron saint of Bosnia and Herzegovina from the medieval times until 26 August 1752, when he was replaced by St. Elijah, and confirmed by papacy, at the request of a Bosnian Franciscan friar, Bishop Pavao Dragičević. The reasons for the replacement are unclear. It has been suggested that Elijah was chosen because of his importance to all three main religious groups in Bosnia and Herzegovina—Catholics, Muslims and Orthodox Christians. Pope Benedict XIV is said to have approved Bishop Dragičević's request with the remark that "a wild nation deserved a wild patron".
