= Macrina the Elder =

Mother of Saint Basil the Elder

Saint Macrina the Elder
- Born: c. AD 270; Neocaesarea, Cappadocia, Roman Empire
- Died: c. AD 340; Neocaesarea, Cappadocia, Roman Empire
- Venerated in: Roman Catholicism; Eastern Orthodoxy; Oriental Orthodoxy
- Feast: January 14
- Patronage: Widows; Invoked against poverty

Macrina the Elder (Greek: Μακρίνα; before AD 270 – c. 340) was the mother of Basil the Elder, and the grandmother of Basil the Great, Gregory of Nyssa, Peter of Sebaste, and Macrina the Younger.

== Life ==
The works of her grandson Basil indicate that she studied under Gregory Thaumaturgus, and that it was his teachings handed down through Macrina to Basil and Gregory, that were particularly formative for the two Cappadocian brothers.

Her home was at Neocaesarea in Pontus and according to Gregory Nazianzen, during the persecution of Christians under Galerius and Diocletian, Macrina fled with her husband to the shores of the Black Sea. Once the persecution had passed, Macrina and her family returned to Neocaesarea.

She was widowed and is the patron of widows. Macrina is also the patron against poverty. Her feast is celebrated on 14 January. She is said to have died in the early 340s AD.
