= List of editiones principes in Greek =

First edition works in Greek

In classical scholarship, the editio princeps (plural: editiones principes) of a work is the first printed edition of the work, that previously had existed only in manuscripts, which could be circulated only after being copied by hand. The following is a list of Greek literature works.

== Greek works ==
=== 15th century ===
Date	Author, Work	Printer	Location	Comment
c. 1474	Batrachomyomachia	Thomas Ferrandus	Brescia	Undated and without place or printer. The book carries an interlinear Latin prose translation together with the Greek text on one page and on the opposite one a metrical Latin translation. The first edition with a date is the 1486 edition by Leonicus Cretensis.
1478-1479	Aesopus, Fabulae	B. & J. A. de Honate	Milan	Edited by Bonus Accursius. Undated, the book contained also a Latin translation by Ranuccio Tettalo. These 127 fables are known as the Collectio Accursiana, the newest of the three recensions that form the Greek Aesopica. The oldest Greek recension is the Collectio Augustana, in 231 fables, that was published only in 1812 by Johann Gottlob Theaenus Schneider in Breslau. The last recension is the Collectio Vindobonensis, made of 130 fables, that was first edited in 1776 by Thomas Tyrwhitt. Concerning The Aesop Romance, of it also three recensions exist: the one printed in this edition is the Vita Accursiana, while the second to be printed was in 1845 the Vita Westermanniana, edited in Braunschweig by Anton Westermann. The Last recension to be printed was the Vita Perriana, edited in 1952 in Urbana by Ben Edwin Perry.
1478-1479	Vita Aesopi	B. & J. A. de Honate	Milan	
c. 1482	Hesiodus, Opera et dies	B. & J. A. de Honate	Milan	Edited by Bonus Accursius. Undated, only Theocritus' first 18 idylls are contained in this edition. A wider arrange of idylls appeared in the 1495–1496 Aldine Theocritus which had idylls I-XXIII. A further amount of yet unpublished idylls were printed in Rome together with their old scholia by Zacharias Calliergis in his 1516 edition of Theocritus.
c. 1482	Theocritus, Idyllia	B. & J. A. de Honate	Milan	Edited by Bonus Accursius. Undated, only Theocritus' first 18 idylls are contained in this edition. A wider arrange of idylls appeared in the 1495–1496 Aldine Theocritus which had idylls I-XXIII. A further amount of yet unpublished idylls were printed in Rome together with their old scholia by Zacharias Calliergis in his 1516 edition of Theocritus.
1488–1489	Homerus, Ilias and Odyssea		Florence	Edited by Demetrius Chalcondyles, the book was printed with the help of Demetrius Damilas that reelaborated the Greek types he had previously used in Milan. The editorial project was completed thanks to the financial support of Giovanni Acciaiuoli and the patronage of Neri and Bernardo de' Nerli together with, the latter also author of an opening dedication to Piero de' Medici. The edition includes also the previously printed Batrachomyomachia. As for the typography the volume has traditionally been attributed to the prolific printer Bartolomeo de' Libri, attribution denied by recent scholarship. The issue thus remains unresolved.
1488–1489	Hymni Homerici		Florence	
1488–1489	Ps.-Herodotus, De vita Homeri		Florence	
1488–1489	Ps.-Plutarch, De vita et poesi Homeri		Florence	
1488–1489	Dio Cocceianus, De Homero		Florence	
1493	Isocrates, Orationes	Ulrich Scinzenzeler & Sebastianus de Ponte Tremulo	Milan	Edited by Demetrius Chalcondyles. The edition also contains 3 ancient lives of Isocrates written by Plutarch, Philostratus and Dionysius of Halicarnassus.
1493	Dionysius Halicarnasseus, De Isocrate	Ulrich Scinzenzeler & Sebastianus de Ponte Tremulo	Milan	Edited by Demetrius Chalcondyles. The edition also contains 3 ancient lives of Isocrates written by Plutarch, Philostratus and Dionysius of Halicarnassus.
1494	Anthologia Planudea	Laurentius de Alopa	Florence	Edited by Janus Lascaris. In this occasion Lascaris used as a typographic font exclusively small capitals in an archaistic effect created so to recapture the feeling of ancient epigraphy. This was to be a characteristic aspect of all the Greek books published together by Lorenzo de Alopa and Lascaris.
c. 1494	Euripides, Medea, Hippolytus, Alcestis and Andromache	Laurentius de Alopa	Florence	Edited by Janus Lascaris. The volume, undated, was printed sometime before June 18, 1494. The typographic font was, as usual with Lascaris, only made of capital letters.
1494	Menander, Monosticha	Laurentius de Alopa	Florence	Edited by Janus Lascaris.
1494–1496	Musaeus, Hero and Leander	Laurentius de Alopa	Florence	Edited by Janus Lascaris. About the same time Aldus Manutius printed in Venice another edition of Musaeus, also undated, but probably published in 1495.
c. 1494	Theodorus Prodromus, Galeomyomachia	Aldus Manutius	Venice	Edited by Arsenius Apostolius. Undated.
1494-1496	Callimachus, Hymni	Laurentius de Alopa	Florence	Edited by Janus Lascaris. Undated.
1495	Ps.-Pythagoras, Aurea Carmina	Aldus Manutius	Venice	Also contains Constantine Lascaris' Erotemata. This edition is also notable as Manutius' first publication.
1495	Ps.-Phocylides, Sententiae	Aldus Manutius	Venice	Also contains Constantine Lascaris' Erotemata. This edition is also notable as Manutius' first publication.
1495–1498	Aristoteles	Aldus Manutius	Venice	An edition in five volumes in folio of the complete works of Aristotle. The first volume was printed in November 1495 while the last came out in 1498. Theophrastus' works came out together in 1497. Notably absent in this edition of Aristotle's works are the Rhetorica and the Poetica and also the Rhetorica ad Alexandrum. Concerning the Problemata, they came out in 1497 in its shorter recension in two books; the longer recension in four books came out in Paris in 1857 due to Hermann Usener. As for Theophrastus, all his published works came out in 1497 dispersed through the second, third and fourth volumes.
1495–1498	Theophrastus, De signis, De causis plantarum, De historia plantarum, De lapidibus, De igne, De odoribus, De ventis, De lassitudine, De vertigine, De sudore, Metaphysica, De piscibus in sicco degentibus	Aldus Manutius	Venice	
1495–1498	Porphyrius, Isagoge	Aldus Manutius	Venice	
1495–1498	Philo, De mundo	Aldus Manutius	Venice	
1495–1498	Ps.-Alexander Aphrodisiensis, Problemata	Aldus Manutius	Venice	
1495–1498	Diogenes Laërtius, Vita Aristotelis and Vita Theophrasti	Aldus Manutius	Venice	
1495	Apollonius Dyscolus, De constructione	Aldus Manutius	Venice	Contained together with Theodorus Gaza's Grammatica.
1495	Aelius Herodianus, De numeris	Aldus Manutius	Venice	Contained together with Theodorus Gaza's Grammatica.
1495–1496	Bion, Adonis	Aldus Manutius	Venice	The edition contains also the idylls I–XXIII attributed to Theocritus. It must be also noted that only Theognis' first book of elegies is printed here.
1495–1496	Moschus, Europa	Aldus Manutius	Venice	The edition contains also the idylls I–XXIII attributed to Theocritus. It must be also noted that only Theognis' first book of elegies is printed here.
1495–1496	Hesiodus	Aldus Manutius	Venice	The edition contains also the idylls I–XXIII attributed to Theocritus. It must be also noted that only Theognis' first book of elegies is printed here.
1495–1496	Scutum Herculis	Aldus Manutius	Venice	The edition contains also the idylls I–XXIII attributed to Theocritus. It must be also noted that only Theognis' first book of elegies is printed here.
1495–1496	Theognis	Aldus Manutius	Venice	The edition contains also the idylls I–XXIII attributed to Theocritus. It must be also noted that only Theognis' first book of elegies is printed here.
1495–1496	Ps.-Moschus, Epitaphium Bionis	Aldus Manutius	Venice	The edition contains also the idylls I–XXIII attributed to Theocritus. It must be also noted that only Theognis' first book of elegies is printed here.
1495–1496	Ps.-Moschus, Megara	Aldus Manutius	Venice	The edition contains also the idylls I–XXIII attributed to Theocritus. It must be also noted that only Theognis' first book of elegies is printed here.
1496	Apollonius Rhodius, Argonautica	Laurentius de Alopa	Florence	Edited by Janus Lascaris. Present in the book are also the so-called Florentine scholia, contained in the manuscript used by Lascaris for this edition.
1496	Lucianus	Laurentius de Alopa	Florence	Edited by Janus Lascaris.
1494–1496	Plutarch, De liberis educandis	Laurentius de Alopa	Florence	Edited by Janus Lascaris.
1494–1496	Ps.-Cebes, Tabula Cebetis	Laurentius de Alopa	Florence	Edited by Janus Lascaris.
1494–1496	Xenophon, Hiero	Laurentius de Alopa	Florence	Edited by Janus Lascaris.
1494–1496	Basilius Magnus, De liberalibus studiis	Laurentius de Alopa	Florence	Edited by Janus Lascaris.
1496	Joannes Philoponus, De dialectis	Aldus Manutius	Venice	Found in the Thesaurus cornu copiae et horti Adonidis.
1497	Zenobius, Proverbia	Benedetto Filologo	Florence	Edited by Philippus Junta.
1497	Ammonius Grammaticus, De adfinium vocabulorum differentia	Aldus Manutius	Venice	Edited by Giovanni Crastone together with his Lexicon graeco-latinum.
1497	Joannes Philoponus, De vocabulis quae diversum significatum exhibent secundum differentiam accentus	Aldus Manutius	Venice	Edited by Giovanni Crastone together with his Lexicon graeco-latinum.
1498	Aristophanes	Aldus Manutius	Venice	9 of Aristophanes' 11 surviving comedies were printed; together with them were Marcus Musurus' metric scholia. Missing in the volume were the Lysistrata and the Thesmophoriazusae which would appear only in 1515.
1498	Ps.-Phalaris, Epistolae	Johannes Bissolus & Benedictus Mangius	Venice	Edited by Bartholomaeus Pelusius and Gabriel Bracius.
1498	Apollonius Tyaneus, Epistolae	Johannes Bissolus & Benedictus Mangius	Venice	Edited by Bartholomaeus Pelusius and Gabriel Bracius.
1498	Marcus Junius Brutus, Epistolae	Johannes Bissolus & Benedictus Mangius	Venice	Edited by Bartholomaeus Pelusius and Gabriel Bracius.
1499	Etymologicum Magnum	Zacharias Calliergis	Venice	Published at the expense of Nikolas Vlastos, the volume was probably edited by Marcus Musurus.
1499	Simplicius, In Aristotelis Categorias commentarium	Zacharias Calliergis	Venice	
1499	Dioscurides, De materia medica	Aldus Manutius	Venice	
1499	Nicander, Theriaca and Alexipharmaca	Aldus Manutius	Venice	
1499	Suda	I. Bissolus & B. Mangius	Milan	Edited by Demetrius Chalcondyles.
1499	Aratus, Phaenomena	Aldus Manutius	Venice	Present in a bilingual miscellany titled Scriptores astronomici veteres which included also works by Firmicus Maternus, Manilius, Germanicus, Cicero and Avienius.
1499	Ps.-Proclus, Sphaera	Aldus Manutius	Venice	Present in a bilingual miscellany titled Scriptores astronomici veteres which included also works by Firmicus Maternus, Manilius, Germanicus, Cicero and Avienius.
1499	Theon Grammaticus, Commentaria in Aratum	Aldus Manutius	Venice	Present in a bilingual miscellany titled Scriptores astronomici veteres which included also works by Firmicus Maternus, Manilius, Germanicus, Cicero and Avienius.
1499	Leontius Mechanicus, De Arati Sphaerae constructione	Aldus Manutius	Venice	Present in a bilingual miscellany titled Scriptores astronomici veteres which included also works by Firmicus Maternus, Manilius, Germanicus, Cicero and Avienius.
1499	Plato, Epistolae	Aldus Manutius	Venice	Edited by Marcus Musurus. All these letters are contained in a compilation titled Epistolae diversorum philosophorum, oratorum, rhetorum. Many of these epistolary collections are incomplete in this edition: for example, only 21 letters by Basil were printed. A larger collection of 61 of his letters was edited by Vincentius Obsopoeus in 1528 in Hagenau. Concerning Alciphron, 44 letters are available in the Aldine and it was only in 1715 in Leipzig that Stephan Bergler edited other 72 letters, printed by Thomas Fritsch. Further discoveries were made until Ernrst Eduard Seiler in 1853 in Leipzig first edited Alciphron's full extant corpus of 123 letters.
1499	Ps.-Diogenes Cynicus, Epistolae	Aldus Manutius	Venice	
1499	Libanius, Epistolae	Aldus Manutius	Venice	
1499	Synesius, Epistolae	Aldus Manutius	Venice	
1499	Isocrates, Epistolae	Aldus Manutius	Venice	
1499	Claudius Aelianus, Epistolae	Aldus Manutius	Venice	
1499	Alciphro, Epistolae	Aldus Manutius	Venice	
1499	Demosthenes, Epistolae	Aldus Manutius	Venice	
1499	Ps.-Demetrius Phalereus, Epistolae	Aldus Manutius	Venice	
1499	Ps.-Aristoteles, Epistolae	Aldus Manutius	Venice	
1499	Ps.-Hippocrates, Epistolae	Aldus Manutius	Venice	
1499	Ps.-Crates Thebanus, Epistolae	Aldus Manutius	Venice	
1499	Ps.-Heraclitus Ephesius, Epistolae	Aldus Manutius	Venice	
1499	Ps.-Anacharsis, Epistolae	Aldus Manutius	Venice	
1499	Ps.-Euripides, Epistolae	Aldus Manutius	Venice	
1499	Philostratus Atheniensis, Epistolae	Aldus Manutius	Venice	
1499	Theophylactus Simocattus, Epistolae	Aldus Manutius	Venice	
1499	Aeneas Gazaeus, Epistolae	Aldus Manutius	Venice	
1499	Procopius Gazaeus, Epistolae	Aldus Manutius	Venice	
1499	Dionysius Sophista, Epistolae	Aldus Manutius	Venice	
1499	Basilius Caesariensis, Epistolae	Aldus Manutius	Venice	
1499	Ps.-Chion Heracleensis, Epistolae	Aldus Manutius	Venice	
1499	Ps.-Aeschines Orator, Epistolae	Aldus Manutius	Venice	
1499	Julianus Apostata, Epistolae	Aldus Manutius	Venice	
1500	Ammonius Hermiae, In Porphyrii isagogen sive V voces	Zacharias Calliergis	Venice	
1500	Galenus, Therapeutica	Zacharias Calliergis	Venice	
1500	Argonautica Orphica	Benedetto Filologo	Florence	Edited by Philippus Junta. The volume also carries some of Proclus' hymns.
1500	Hymni Orphici	Benedetto Filologo	Florence	Edited by Philippus Junta. The volume also carries some of Proclus' hymns.

=== 16th century ===
Date	Author, Work	Printer	Location	Comment
1501–1502	Philostratus Atheniensis, Vita Apollonii Tyanei	Aldus Manutius	Venice	
1501–1502	Eusebius Caesariensis, Adversus Hieroclem	Aldus Manutius	Venice	
1502	Sophocles	Aldus Manutius	Venice	
1502	Thucydides, Historiae	Aldus Manutius	Venice	
1502	Dionysius Halicarnasseus, Epistola ad Ammaeum II	Aldus Manutius	Venice	
1502	Herodotus, Historiae	Aldus Manutius	Venice	
1502	Julius Pollux, Onomasticon	Aldus Manutius	Venice	
1502	Stephanus Byzantinus, Ethnica	Aldus Manutius	Venice	
1503	Harpocration, Lexicon in decem oratores Atticos	Aldus Manutius	Venice	
1503	Ulpianus Sophista, Scholia in Demosthenem	Aldus Manutius	Venice	
1503	Euripides	Aldus Manutius	Venice	This edition included all of the dramatist's plays except for Electra. Generally thought to have been edited by Marcus Musurus.
1503	Xenophon, Hellenica	Aldus Manutius	Venice	
1503	Herodianus, Historiarum a Marci principatu libri viii	Aldus Manutius	Venice	
1503	Philostratus Atheniensis, Vitae sophistarum	Aldus Manutius	Venice	
1503	Joannes Philoponus, In Aristotelis Categorias commentarium	Aldus Manutius	Venice	Also contains a commentary on Aristotle's De Interpretatione by Leo Magentinus.
1503	Ammonius Hermiae, In Aristotelis de interpretatione commentarius	Aldus Manutius	Venice	Also contains a commentary on Aristotle's De Interpretatione by Leo Magentinus.
1503	Michael Psellus, In Aristotelis de interpretatione commentarius	Aldus Manutius	Venice	Also contains a commentary on Aristotle's De Interpretatione by Leo Magentinus.
1504	Demosthenes	Aldus Manutius	Venice	
1504	Gregorius Nazianzenus, Carmina	Aldus Manutius	Venice	Contained in the collection Poetae Christiani.
1504	Joannes Philoponus, In Aristotelis analytica posteriora commentaria	Aldus Manutius	Venice	Also contains an anonymous commentary on Aristotle's Analytica posteriora.
1504–1505	Quintus Smyrnaeus, Posthomerica	Aldus Manutius	Venice	
1504–1505	Tryphiodorus, Ilii excidium	Aldus Manutius	Venice	
1504–1505	Coluthus, Raptus Helenae	Aldus Manutius	Venice	
1505	Ps.-Heraclitus Ponticus, Allegoriae Homericae	Aldus Manutius	Venice	Printed together with Aesop.
1505	Ps.-Horapollo, Hieroglyphica	Aldus Manutius	Venice	Printed together with Aesop.
1505	Cornutus, Theologiae Graecae compendium	Aldus Manutius	Venice	Printed together with Aesop.
1508-1509	Aristoteles, Rhetorica and Poetica	Aldus Manutius	Venice	Edited by Demetrius Ducas. Contained in the Rhetores Graeci.
1508-1509	Ps.-Aristotle, Rhetorica ad Alexandrum	Aldus Manutius	Venice	Edited by Demetrius Ducas. Contained in the Rhetores Graeci.
1508-1509	Dionysius Halicarnasseus, Ars Rhetorica and De Compositione Verborum	Aldus Manutius	Venice	Edited by Demetrius Ducas. Contained in the Rhetores Graeci.
1508-1509	Aphthonius, Progymnasmata	Aldus Manutius	Venice	Edited by Demetrius Ducas. Contained in the Rhetores Graeci.
1508-1509	Hermogenes, De statibus, De inventione and De ideis	Aldus Manutius	Venice	Edited by Demetrius Ducas. Contained in the Rhetores Graeci.
1508-1509	Ps.-Hermogenes, De methodo sollertiae	Aldus Manutius	Venice	Edited by Demetrius Ducas. Contained in the Rhetores Graeci.
1508-1509	Aelius Aristides, De civili oratione and De simplici oratione	Aldus Manutius	Venice	Edited by Demetrius Ducas. Contained in the Rhetores Graeci.
1508-1509	Apsines, Rhetorica	Aldus Manutius	Venice	Edited by Demetrius Ducas. Contained in the Rhetores Graeci.
1508-1509	Menander Rhetor, Divisio causarum in genere demonstrativo	Aldus Manutius	Venice	Edited by Demetrius Ducas. Contained in the Rhetores Graeci.
1508-1509	Sopater, Quaestiones de compendis declamationibus	Aldus Manutius	Venice	Edited by Demetrius Ducas. Contained in the Rhetores Graeci.
1508-1509	Cyrus Sophista, differentiae statuum	Aldus Manutius	Venice	Edited by Demetrius Ducas. Contained in the Rhetores Graeci.
1508-1509	Ps.-Demetrius Phalereus, De elocutione	Aldus Manutius	Venice	Edited by Demetrius Ducas. Contained in the Rhetores Graeci.
1508-1509	Alexander Sophista, De figuris sensus et dictione	Aldus Manutius	Venice	Edited by Demetrius Ducas. Contained in the Rhetores Graeci.
1508-1509	Minucianus, De argumentis	Aldus Manutius	Venice	Edited by Demetrius Ducas. Contained in the Rhetores Graeci.
1509	Plutarch, Moralia	Aldus Manutius	Venice	Edited by Demetrius Ducas.
1509	Agapetus Diaconus, De officio regis	Zacharias Calliergis	Venice	
1512	Dionysius Periegetes, Orbis Terrae Descriptio	J. Mazochius	Ferrara	With annotions by Caelius Calcagninus.
1513	Lysias	Aldus Manutius	Venice	Edited by Marcus Musurus, these writers are all contained in a collection known as Oratores Graeci.
1513	Lycurgus Atheniensis	Aldus Manutius	Venice	Edited by Marcus Musurus, these writers are all contained in a collection known as Oratores Graeci.
1513	Antiphon of Rhamnus	Aldus Manutius	Venice	Edited by Marcus Musurus, these writers are all contained in a collection known as Oratores Graeci.
1513	Andocides	Aldus Manutius	Venice	Edited by Marcus Musurus, these writers are all contained in a collection known as Oratores Graeci.
1513	Isaeus	Aldus Manutius	Venice	Edited by Marcus Musurus, these writers are all contained in a collection known as Oratores Graeci.
1513	Aeschines Orator	Aldus Manutius	Venice	Edited by Marcus Musurus, these writers are all contained in a collection known as Oratores Graeci.
1513	Dinarchus	Aldus Manutius	Venice	Edited by Marcus Musurus, these writers are all contained in a collection known as Oratores Graeci.
1513	Gorgias	Aldus Manutius	Venice	Edited by Marcus Musurus, these writers are all contained in a collection known as Oratores Graeci.
1513	Alcidamas	Aldus Manutius	Venice	Edited by Marcus Musurus, these writers are all contained in a collection known as Oratores Graeci.
1513	Lesbonax	Aldus Manutius	Venice	Edited by Marcus Musurus, these writers are all contained in a collection known as Oratores Graeci.
1513	Herodes Atticus	Aldus Manutius	Venice	Edited by Marcus Musurus, these writers are all contained in a collection known as Oratores Graeci.
1513	Dionysius Halicanasseus, De Lysia	Aldus Manutius	Venice	Edited by Marcus Musurus, these writers are all contained in a collection known as Oratores Graeci.
1513	Alexander Aphrodisiensis, In Aristotelis Topica Commentaria	Aldus Manutius	Venice	
1513	Pindar	Aldus Manutius	Venice	Two years later Zacharias Calliergis printed in Rome an edition also carrying for the first time the poet's scholia. The volume also contains Callimachus and Dionysius Periegetes.
1513	Lycophron, Alexandra	Aldus Manutius	Venice	Two years later Zacharias Calliergis printed in Rome an edition also carrying for the first time the poet's scholia. The volume also contains Callimachus and Dionysius Periegetes.
1513	Plato	Aldus Manutius	Venice	This opera omnia of Plato was edited by Marcus Musurus. It contains in its preface an Ode to Plato, a renaissance elegiac poem to the Greek philosopher written by Musurus himself.
1513	Ps.-Plato, Eryxias, Axiochus, De virtute, Definitiones, De justo, Demodochus and Sisyphus	Aldus Manutius	Venice	This opera omnia of Plato was edited by Marcus Musurus. It contains in its preface an Ode to Plato, a renaissance elegiac poem to the Greek philosopher written by Musurus himself.
1513	Ps.-Timaeus Locrus, De natura mundi et animae	Aldus Manutius	Venice	This opera omnia of Plato was edited by Marcus Musurus. It contains in its preface an Ode to Plato, a renaissance elegiac poem to the Greek philosopher written by Musurus himself.
1513	Aelius Aristides, Panathenaica oratio and In Romam oratio	Aldus Manutius	Venice	First printed among Isocrates 'Opera omnia.
1514	Athenaeus, Deipnosophistae	Aldus Manutius	Venice	Edited by Marcus Musurus.
1514	Hesychius Alexandrinus, Lexicon	Aldus Manutius	Venice	Edited by Marcus Musurus.
1515	Oppianus Anazarbeus, Halieutica	Philippus Junta	Florence	Edited by Marcus Musurus.
1515	Aristophanes, Lysistrata and Thesmophoriazusae	Philippus Junta	Florence	First complete edition of all eleven Aristophanes' plays.
1516	Xenophon	Philippus Junta	Florence	A complete edition of Xenophon's works with the exception of the Apologia Socratis, the Agesilaus and the De vectigalibus.
1516	Gregorius Nazianzenus, Orationes Lectissimae	Aldus Manutius	Venice	
1516	Novum Testamentum	Johannes Frobenius	Basel	Edited by Desiderius Erasmus under the title Novum Instrumentum omne. The first New Testament text to be actually printed (but not published), it was contained in Cardinal Francisco Jiménez de Cisneros's Complutensian Polyglot Bible, where it was printed as volume 5 in 1514 in Alcalá. It was not published until 1520.
1516	Strabo, Geographica	Aldine Press	Venice	
1516	Pausanias, Graeciae descriptio	Aldine Press	Venice	Edited by Marcus Musurus.
1516	Phrynichus, Sylloge Atticarum vocum	Zacharias Calliergis	Rome	
1516	Ps.-Dionysius Areopagita	Philippus Junta	Florence	
1517	Libanius	J. Mazochius	Ferrara	
1517	Plutarch, Vitae Parallelae	Philippus Junta	Florence	
1517	Aelius Aristides, Orationes	Philippus Junta	Florence	Edited by Eufrosinus Boninus. Two of Aristides' speeches, the XVI (Oratio legati) and LIII (In Aquam Pergami oratio), are missing. The volume also contains Philostratus' Life of Aristides (part of the Lives of the Sophists).
1517	Libanius, Ad Theodosium imperatorem de seditione antiochena	Philippus Junta	Florence	Edited by Eufrosinus Boninus. Two of Aristides' speeches, the XVI (Oratio legati) and LIII (In Aquam Pergami oratio), are missing. The volume also contains Philostratus' Life of Aristides (part of the Lives of the Sophists).
1517	Oppianus Apameensis, Cynegetica	Aldine Press	Venice	Printed together with Oppianus Anazarbeus' Halieutica and its Latin translation.
1518	Septuaginta	Aldus Manutius	Venice	The Septuaginta contained in the Complutensian Polyglot Bible was to be published later. The Complutensian Bible had been printed between 1514 and 1517 in Alcalá under the supervision of Cardinal Francisco Jiménez de Cisneros, but it was only published in 1520. For the New Testament, Manutius' Aldine Bible used Erasmus' Novum Instrumentum omne.
1518	Aeschylus	Aldine Press	Venice	Edited by Franciscus Asulanus. This edition contains only 6 of Aeschylus' 7 surviving tragedies: missing is the Choephoroe. This is because the manuscripts had fused Agamemnon and Choephoroe, omitting lines 311-1066 of Agamemnon, a mistake that was corrected for the first time in 1552 in the Venetian edition edited by Franciscus Robortellus. The separation was not fully successful as the text was not correctly divided, leaving it to the 1557 Paris edition by Petrus Victorius, printed with an appendix by Henricus Stephanus, to finally obtain an adequate edition of Aeschylus' plays.
1518	Artemidorus, Oneirocritica	Aldine Press	Venice	
1518	Synesius, De somniis	Aldine Press	Venice	
1518	Porphyrius, Homericarum quaestionum and De antro nympharum		Rome	Edited by Janus Lascaris
1520	Xenophon, Apologia Socratis and Agesilaus	Johannes Reuchlin	Hagenau	This edition also carries the Hiero.
1520	Alexander Aphrodisiensis, Commentaria in Aristotelis Analytica Priora	Aldine Press	Venice	
1520	Ps.-Alexander Aphrodisiensis, In Aristotelis sophisticos elenchos commentarium	Aldine Press	Venice	
1521	Alcinous, Didascalicus	Aldine Press	Venice	Edited by Franciscus Asulanus and printed together with Apuleius.
1525	Galenus	Aldine Press	Venice	
1525	Xenophon, De vectigalibus	Aldine Press	Venice	De vectigalibus was in a new edition of the complete works lacking only Apologia Socratis.
1525	Ps.-Xenophon, Atheniensium respublica	Aldine Press	Venice	De vectigalibus was in a new edition of the complete works lacking only Apologia Socratis.
1526	Hippocrates	Aldine Press	Venice	
1526	Joannes Philoponus, In libros de generatione animalium commentaria	Johannes Antonio de Sabio	Venice	
1526	Simplicius, In Aristotelis physicorum libros commentaria and In Aristotelis de caelo commentaria	Aldus Manutius	Venice	Simplicius' commentary on De caelo is Basilius Bessarion's Greek translation of William of Moerbeke's Latin version.
1526	Maccabeorum liber IV		Strasbourg	Edited by Johannes Leonicerus in the Strasbourg Septuagint.
1527	Theophrastus, Characteres	Johannes Petreius	Nuremberg	Edited by Bilibaldus Pirckheimerus, the volume only contains the first fifteen chapters. In a later edition in Venice of the Aldine altera of Aristotle and Theophrastus' collected works eight chapters were added in 1551-1552 by Joannes Baptista Camotius. To these, a further five chapters were adjoined by Isaac Casaubon in Lyon in 1599. The last two chapters were found by Giovanni Cristofano Amaduzzi who edited them in Parma in 1786.
1527	Alexander Aphrodisiensis, Commentaria in Aristotelis Librum de Sensu	Aldine Press	Venice	This edition also contains Themistius' De Anima.
1527	Simplicius, In libros Aristotelis de anima commentaria	Aldine Press	Venice	This edition also contains Themistius' De Anima.
1527	Michael Ephesius, In parva naturalia commentaria	Aldine Press	Venice	This edition also contains Themistius' De Anima.
1527	Alexander Aphrodisiensis, In Aristotelis metereologicorum libros commentarium and De mixtione	Aldine Press	Venice	
1527	Joannes Philoponus, In Aristotelis libros de generatione et corruptione commentaria	Aldine Press	Venice	
1528	Epictetus, Enchiridion	Johannes Antonio de Sabio	Venice	Epictetus was not published fully and separately in 1528 but as integrated in Simplicius' commentary; it was in 1529 that the complete text came out in Nuremberg edited by Gregorius Haloander.
1528	Simplicius, Commentarius in Enchiridion Epicteti	Johannes Antonio de Sabio	Venice	Epictetus was not published fully and separately in 1528 but as integrated in Simplicius' commentary; it was in 1529 that the complete text came out in Nuremberg edited by Gregorius Haloander.
1528	Paulus Aegineta, De Re Medica Libri VII	Aldine Press	Venice	
1528	Gregorius Nazianzenus, Epistolae		Hagenau	Edited by Vincentius Obsopoeus. It contains 57 letters written by Gregory together with many letters from Basil that had never been printed before.
1529	Joannes Chrysostomus, In Pauli Epistolas	Stephanus de Sabio	Verona	Edited by Bernardinus Donatus.
1529	Ps.-Epiphanius, Vitae Prophetarum	Andreas Cratander	Basel	Edited by Albanus Torinus A Latin version attributed to Dorotheus of Tyre was published in 1557 by Wolfgang Musculus.
1530	Polybius, Historiae	Johannes Secerius	Hagenau	A part of Book VI had been already printed in Venice in 1529 by Johannes Antonio de Sabio, edited by Janus Lascaris with his Latin translation incorporated. The 1530 edition, edited by Vincentius Obsopoeus, only contained Books I–V together with their Latin translation made by Nicolaus Perottus. What survived of the rest of Polybius thanks to the excerpta antiqua of the other Books was first printed by Joannes Hervagius in Basel in 1549 together with a Latin translation by Wolfgang Musculus. Further Polybian excerpts came to light thanks to Fulvius Ursinus that in Antwerp in 1582 published Constantinus Porphyrogenitus' Excerpta de legationibus. All this additional material was incorporated in Isaac Casaubon's 1609 Polybius Paris edition.
1531	Parthenius, Erotica Pathemata	Hieronymus Frobenius	Basel	Edited by Janus Cornarius.
1531	Procopius Caesariensis, De aedificiis		Basel	Edited by Beatus Rhenanus. The edition was incomplete; the full text came out in 1607 in Augsburg, edited by David Hoeschel.
1531	Proclus, De motu	I. Bebel & M. Ysingrinius	Basel	Edited by Simon Grynaeus.
1532	Stobaeus, Anthologium	Hieronymus Frobenius	Basel	Edited by Sigismundus Gelenius together with the hymns of Callimachus. Gelenius only published the second part, the Florilegium, and a selection of that; a complete edition of the Florilegium came in 1535 or 1536 in Venice where it was printed by Bartolomeo Zanetti and edited by Victor Trincavelius. In 1575 the first part, the Eclogae, was first published in 1575 in Antwerp, printed by Christoph Plantin and edited by William Canter. The complete text was first printed together in 1609 in Geneva by F. Fabro.
1533	Diogenes Laërtius, Vitae Philosophorum	Hieronymus Frobenius	Basel	The lives of Aristotle and Theophrastus had been previously printed in Aristotle's 1495-98 Aldine edition.
1532	Ps.-Oecumenius, Catena in Actus Apostolorum, Catena in Pauli epistulas, Catena in epistulas catholicas	Stephanus de Sabio	Verona	Edited by Bernardinus Donatus in a volume titled Expositiones antiquae ex diversis sanctorum partum commentariis ab Oecumenio et Aretha collectae in hosce Novi Testamenti tractatus. Oecumenii quidem in Acta Apostolorum. In septem Epistolas quae Catholicae dicuntur. In Pauli omnes. Arethae vero in Ioannis Apocalypsim.
1532	Arethas Caesariensis, Commentarius in Apocalypsin	Stephanus de Sabio	Verona	Edited by Bernardinus Donatus in a volume titled Expositiones antiquae ex diversis sanctorum partum commentariis ab Oecumenio et Aretha collectae in hosce Novi Testamenti tractatus. Oecumenii quidem in Acta Apostolorum. In septem Epistolas quae Catholicae dicuntur. In Pauli omnes. Arethae vero in Ioannis Apocalypsim.
1533	Hanno, Periplus Hannonis	Hieronymus Frobenius	Basel	Contained in a miscellany of geographical writings. Edited by Sigismundus Gelenius.
1533	Periplus Maris Erythraei	Hieronymus Frobenius	Basel	Contained in a miscellany of geographical writings. Edited by Sigismundus Gelenius.
1533	Arrianus, Periplus Pontis Euxini	Hieronymus Frobenius	Basel	Contained in a miscellany of geographical writings. Edited by Sigismundus Gelenius.
1533	Strabo, Chrestomathiae	Hieronymus Frobenius	Basel	Contained in a miscellany of geographical writings. Edited by Sigismundus Gelenius.
1533	Ps.-Plutarch, De fluviis	Hieronymus Frobenius	Basel	Contained in a miscellany of geographical writings. Edited by Sigismundus Gelenius.
1533	Euclides, Elementa Geometriae	Joannes Hervagius	Basel	Edited by Simon Grynaeus.
1533	Proclus, In primum Euclidis Elementorum librum commentarii	Joannes Hervagius	Basel	Edited by Simon Grynaeus.
1533	Ptolemaeus, Geographia	Hieronymus Frobenius	Basel	
1534	Proclus, In Platonis rem publicam commentarii and In Platonis Timaeum commentaria	J. Valder	Basel	Edited by Simon Grynaeus as part of his edition of Plato.
1534	Aëtius Amidenus, Libri Medicinales	Aldine Press	Venice	Only the first half of the Libri Medicinales were printed.
1534	Alexander Aphrodisiensis, De Anima, De Fato and De Intellectu	Aldine Press	Venice	It is generally believed that De Anima's Book II is not in its current form to be ascribed to Alexander.
1534	Themistius	Aldine Press	Venice	It is generally believed that De Anima's Book II is not in its current form to be ascribed to Alexander.
1534	Eustratius, In analyticorum posteriorum librum secundum commentarium	Aldine Press	Venice	Also contained Joannes Philoponus' In Posteriora Analytica and an anonymos commentary also on the Posterior Analytics.
1534	Heliodorus Emesenus, Aethiopica	Joannes Hervagius	Basel	Edited by Vincentius Obsopoeus.
1535	Joannes Philoponus, In Aristotelis physicorum libros commentaria	Bartolomeo Zanetti	Venice	Edited by Victor Trincavelius. Only the commentary to the first 4 Books was printed.
1535	Joannes Philoponus, In Aristotelis de anima libros commentaria	Bartolomeo Zanetti	Venice	Edited by Victor Trincavelius.
1535	Joannes Philoponus, Contra Proclum de aeternitate mundi	Aldine Press	Venice	Edited by Victor Trincavelius.
1535	Epictetus, Dissertationes		Venice	Edited by Victor Trincavelius.
1535	Arrianus, Anabasis Alexandri and Indica	Bartolomeo Zanetti	Venice	Edited by Victor Trincavelius.
1535	Ptolemaeus, Quadripartitum	Hieronymus Frobenius	Nuremberg	Edited by Joachim Camerarius.
1535	Aelius Aristides, Oratio legati		Hagenau	Edited by Joachim Camerarius.
1535	Libanius, Achillis ad Ulixem antilogia		Hagenau	Edited by Joachim Camerarius.
1536	Joannes Philoponus, In Aristotelis analytica priora commentaria	Bartolomeo Zanetti	Venice	Edited by Victor Trincavelius.
1536	Alexander Aphrodisiensis, Quaestiones naturales et morales	Bartolomeo Zanetti	Venice	Edited by Victor Trincavelius together with works of Damascius and others. The Quaestiones are generally thought to be not his in their current form, but they include material from his school of thought.
1536	Aspasius, In ethica Nicomachea commentaria	Aldine Press	Venice	Contained in a collection of commentaries to Aristotle's Ethica Nicomachea. It also includes an anonymous Byzantine scholiast.
1536	Eustratius, In ethica Nicomachea commentaria	Aldine Press	Venice	Contained in a collection of commentaries to Aristotle's Ethica Nicomachea. It also includes an anonymous Byzantine scholiast.
1536	Michael Ephesius, In ethica Nicomachea commentaria	Aldine Press	Venice	Contained in a collection of commentaries to Aristotle's Ethica Nicomachea. It also includes an anonymous Byzantine scholiast.
1537	Hippiatrica	Johannes Walderus	Basel	Edited by Simon Grynaeus.
1538	Ptolemaeus, Almagestum	Johannes Walderus	Basel	Edited by Ioachimus Camerarius. The second part of the edition is a commentary on the Almagest that used several different authors: while it mostly uses Theon (he covers Books I-II, IV, VI-X, XII-XIII), he also uses Pappus for Book V and Nicolaus Cabasilas for Book III. Despite Pappus' commentary on Book VI also having reached us, it was not printed on this occasion, and was instead published in 1931 by Adolphe Rome in the first volume of his Commentaires de Pappus et de Théon d'Alexandrie sur l'Almageste. In a similar vein, Theon's Book III was not published, and was printed in 1943 as the third volume of his collection.
1538	Pappus, Commentaria in Almagestum	Johannes Walderus	Basel	
1538	Theon Alexandrinus, Commentaria in Almagestum	Johannes Walderus	Basel	
1538	Nicomachus Gerasenus, Introductio Arithmetica	Chrétien Wechel	Paris	
1539	Diodorus Siculus, Bibliotheca historica	Johannes Oporinus	Basel	Edited by Vincentius Obsopoeus. Only books XVI–XX were printed. In 1559 Henricus Stephanus printed in Geneva all complete surviving books, that is I–V and XI–XX. To this Stephanus also added a summary left by Photius of the lost books.
1539	Cassianus Bassus, Geoponica	Robert Winter	Basel	Edited by Johannes Alexander Brassicanus. Printed together with Aristotle's De plantis.
1539	Ps.-Iustinus Martyr, Cohortatio ad Graecos	Ioannes Lodovicus	Paris	
1539	Cleomedes, De motu circulari corporum caelestium	Conrad Neobar	Paris	The editor is unknown.
1540	Proclus, Hypotypsosis astronomicarum positionum	J. Valder	Basel	Edited by Simon Grynaeus.
1540	Adamantius Judaeus, Physiognomica		Paris	
1541	Priscianus Lydus, Metaphrasis in Theophrastum	Johannes Oporinus	Basel	Published in an edition of Theophrastus' Opera.
1541	Athenagoras, De resurrectione mortuorum	Bartholomaeus Gravius	Leuven	Edited by Petrus Nannius.
1543	Ps.-Iamblichus, Theologoumena Arithmethicae		Paris	
1543	Galenus, De ossibus		Paris	Edited by Martinus Gregorius.
1544	Eusebius Caesariensis, Historia Ecclesiastica and Vita Constantini	Robertus Stephanus	Paris	Stephanus put in a single large folio volume works of Eusebius, Socrates, Sozomen, Evagrius, Theodoret and the surviving excerpts of Theodorus Lector's work. The manuscripts used appear to have been the Codex Regius and the Codex Medicaeus.
1544	Socrates Scholasticus, Historia Ecclesiastica	Robertus Stephanus	Paris	Stephanus put in a single large folio volume works of Eusebius, Socrates, Sozomen, Evagrius, Theodoret and the surviving excerpts of Theodorus Lector's work. The manuscripts used appear to have been the Codex Regius and the Codex Medicaeus.
1544	Sozomenus, Historia ecclesiastica	Robertus Stephanus	Paris	Stephanus put in a single large folio volume works of Eusebius, Socrates, Sozomen, Evagrius, Theodoret and the surviving excerpts of Theodorus Lector's work. The manuscripts used appear to have been the Codex Regius and the Codex Medicaeus.
1544	Evagrius Scholasticus, Historia ecclesiastica	Robertus Stephanus	Paris	Stephanus put in a single large folio volume works of Eusebius, Socrates, Sozomen, Evagrius, Theodoret and the surviving excerpts of Theodorus Lector's work. The manuscripts used appear to have been the Codex Regius and the Codex Medicaeus.
1544	Theodoret, Historia Ecclesiastica	Robertus Stephanus	Paris	Stephanus put in a single large folio volume works of Eusebius, Socrates, Sozomen, Evagrius, Theodoret and the surviving excerpts of Theodorus Lector's work. The manuscripts used appear to have been the Codex Regius and the Codex Medicaeus.
1544	Theodorus Lector, Historia Ecclesiastica	Robertus Stephanus	Paris	Stephanus put in a single large folio volume works of Eusebius, Socrates, Sozomen, Evagrius, Theodoret and the surviving excerpts of Theodorus Lector's work. The manuscripts used appear to have been the Codex Regius and the Codex Medicaeus.
1544	Eusebius Caesariensis, Demonstratio Evangelica	Robertus Stephanus	Paris	
1544	Archimedes	Joannes Hervagius	Basel	Edited by Thomas Gechauff Venatorius.
1544	Josephus Flavius	Hieronymus Frobenius & Nicolaus Episcopius	Basel	Edited by Arnoldus Arlenius. The volume also contained the 4 Maccabees, then attributed to Josephus.
1545	Claudius Aelianus, Variae Historiae	Antonio Blado	Rome	Edited by Camillus Peruscus.
1545	Ps.-Melampus, Divinatio ex palpitatione	Antonio Blado	Rome	Edited by Camillus Peruscus.
1544	Epiphanius Constantiensis	Johannes Hervagius	Basel	Edited by Johannes Oporinus.
1545	Euripides, Electra		Rome	Edited by Petrus Victorius.
1545	Oracula Sibyllina	Johannes Oporinus	Basel	Edited by Xystus Betuleius.
1546	Eusebius Caesariensis, Praeparatio Evangelica	Robertus Stephanus	Paris	
1546	Joannes Tzetzes, Chiliades	Johannes Oporinus	Basel	Edited by Nikolaus Gerbel.
1546	Theophilus Antiochenus, Ad Autolycum	Christophorus Froschoverus	Zürich	Edited by Johannes Frisius.
1546	Dionysius Halicarnasseus, Antiquitates Romanae	Robertus Stephanus	Paris	
1546	Tatianus, Oratio ad Graecos	Christoph Froschauer	Zürich	Edited by Conradus Gesnerus.
1548	Cassius Dio	Robertus Stephanus	Paris	Only contains Books 23 and 36–58.
1548	Porphyrius, De abstinentia	Juntine Press	Florence	Edited by Petrus Victorius. The volume also contained Porphyrius' Sententiae, Eunapius' Vita Porphyrii (part of his Vitae sophistarum) and Michael of Ephesus' commentaries to Aristotle's De Partibus Animalium.
1548	Alexander Trallianus, Therapeutica and De febribus	Robertus Stephanus	Paris	Edited by Iacobus Goupyl.
1550	Gregorius Nazianzenus	Johannes Hervagius	Basel	Appeared under Gregory Nazianenus' Opera omnia with the title Divi Gregorii Theologi, Episcopi Nazianzeni Opera, quae quidem extant, omnia, tam soluta quam pedestri oratione conscripta, partim quidem iam olim, partim vero nunc primum etiam è Greco in Latinum conversa.The Thaumaturge's work is here erroneously attributed to the other Gregory, even though Hervagius noted some doubts concerning to such an ascription.
1550	Gregorius Thaumaturgus, Metaphrasis in Ecclesiasten	Johannes Hervagius	Basel	Appeared under Gregory Nazianenus' Opera omnia with the title Divi Gregorii Theologi, Episcopi Nazianzeni Opera, quae quidem extant, omnia, tam soluta quam pedestri oratione conscripta, partim quidem iam olim, partim vero nunc primum etiam è Greco in Latinum conversa.The Thaumaturge's work is here erroneously attributed to the other Gregory, even though Hervagius noted some doubts concerning to such an ascription.
1550	Clemens Alexandrinus		Florence	Edited by Petrus Victorius
1551	Appianus	C. Stephanus	Paris	
1551	Joannes Xiphilinus, Epitome	Robertus Stephanus	Paris	Epitome of Cassius Dio (comprising books 36–80), thus following up on Estienne's Cassius Dio edition of 1548.
1551	Olympiodorus Alexandrinus, In Aristotelis meteora commentaria	Aldine Press	Venice	Contained in the so-called Aldina minor, a re-edition of Aristotle's opera omnia.
1551	Joannes Philoponus, In Aristotelis meteorologicorum librum primum commentarium	Aldine Press	Venice	Contained in the so-called Aldina minor, a re-edition of Aristotle's opera omnia.
c. 1551	Dio Cocceianus	Aldine Press	Venice	
1551	Iustinus Martyr	Robertus Stephanus	Paris	Published by Robert Estienne as Justin's collected works under the title Iustini Opera Omnia, the edition includes both the author's genuine and spurious works.
1551	Ps.-Iustinus Martyr, Expositio rectae fidae, De monarchia, and Epistula ad Zenam et Serenum	Robertus Stephanus	Paris	Published by Robert Estienne as Justin's collected works under the title Iustini Opera Omnia, the edition includes both the author's genuine and spurious works.
1552	Theophrastus, De sensibus	Aldine Press	Venice	Edited by Joannes Baptista Camotius in the so-called Aldina altera, that is the new Aldine edition of Aristotle's works.
1552	Philo	Adrianus Turnebus	Paris	
1552	Aelianus Tacticus, Tactica	A. & J. Spinelli	Venice	Edited by Franciscus Robortellus.
1553	Hermias philosophus, Irrisio gentilium philosophorum	Johannes Oporinus	Basel	Edited by Raphael Seiler.
1553	Synesius	Adrianus Turnebus	Paris	
1554	Anacreontea	Henricus Stephanus	Paris	
1554	Ps.-Proclus, Paraphrasin Tetrabibli		Basel	Edited by Philipp Melanchthon.
1554	Poemander	Adrianus Turnebus	Paris	
1554	Definitiones	Adrianus Turnebus	Paris	
1554	Dionysius Halicarnasseus, Epistola ad Ammaeum I, Epistola ad Pompeium and De antiquis oratoribus	Henricus Stephanus	Paris	
1554	Ps.-Longinus, De Sublimitate	Johannes Oporinus	Basel	Edited by Franciscus Robortellus.
1554	Aretaeus of Cappadocia, De causis et signis acutorum morborum, De causis et signis chronicorum morborum, De curatione acutorum morborum and De curatione chronicorum morborum		Paris	Edited by Iacobus Goupyl.
1555	Ps.-Apollodorus, Bibliotheca	Antonio Blado	Rome	Edited by Benedictus Aegius with a Latin translation.
1555	Ps.-Clemens Romanus, Epitome prior	Adrianus Turnebus	Paris	Also edited by Adrianus Turnebus.
1556	Claudius Aelianus, De natura animalium		Zürich	Edited by Conradus Gesnerus in Aelian's first printed complete works.
1557	Maximus Tyrius, Sermones	Henricus Stephanus	Paris	
1557	Theophrastus, De animi defectione, De nervorum resolutione, De animalibus quae colorem mutant, De animalibus quae repente apparent, De animalibus quae dicuntur invidere, De melle	Henricus Stephanus	Paris	Edited by Henricus Stephanus in his edition of Aristotle and Theophrastus' collected works Aristotelis et Theophrasti scripta quaedam.
1557	Joannes Zonaras, Annales	Johannes Oporinus	Basel	Edited buy Hieronymus Wolfius.
1557	Nicetas Choniates, Historia	Johannes Oporinus	Basel	Edited by Hieronymus Wolfius.
1557	Euclides, Optica, Catoptrica, Sectio Canonis and Introductio harmonica	Andreas Wechelus	Paris	Edited by Johannes Pena.
1557	Ignatius Antiochenus, Epistolae	Sebaldus Mair	Dillingen	Edited by Valentinus Paceus. Two different recensions survive of his letters: a longer one (recensio longior), which is the one printed here; and a shorter one (recensio brevior), of which six letters were edited by Isaak Vossius in Amsterdam in 1646. That left the recensio brevior of the Epistola ad Romanos, that was first published in Paris in 1689 by Thierry Ruinart together with the Martyrium Ignatii.
1557	Ps.-Ignatius Antiochenus, Epistolae	Sebaldus Mair	Dillingen	Edited by Valentinus Paceus. Two different recensions survive of his letters: a longer one (recensio longior), which is the one printed here; and a shorter one (recensio brevior), of which six letters were edited by Isaak Vossius in Amsterdam in 1646. That left the recensio brevior of the Epistola ad Romanos, that was first published in Paris in 1689 by Thierry Ruinart together with the Martyrium Ignatii.
1557	Athenagoras, Legatio pro Christianis	Henricus Stephanus	Geneva	Edited by Conradus Gesnerus. This edition also contains Athenagoras' De resurrectione.
1558	Theodosius Tripolites, Sphaerica	André Wechel	Paris	Edited by Johannes Pena.
1559	Marcus Aurelius, Meditationes	Andreas Gesner	Zürich	Edited by Guilielmus Xylander. Both texts are translated in Latin, the Meditationes by Xylander. He also added some passages on evidence regarding Marcus Aurelius taken from the Suda and from Aurelius Victor.
1559	Aeneas Gazaeus, Theophrastus		Zürich	Edited by Johannes Wolfius.
1561	Epistula Aristeae	Johannes Oporinus	Basel	Edited by Simone Schard.
1561	Photius, Nomocanon	Johannes Oporinus	Basel	
1562	Maximus Confessor, Scholia in Dionysium Areopagitam	G. Morelius	Paris	In this edition of the Corpus Dionysiacum the commentaries of Maximus the Confessor and John of Scythopolis are merged.
1562	Ioannes Scythopolitanus, Scholia in Dionysium Areopagitam	G. Morelius	Paris	In this edition of the Corpus Dionysiacum the commentaries of Maximus the Confessor and John of Scythopolis are merged.
1563	Constitutiones Apostolorum		Venice	Edited by Franciscus Turrianus.
1564	Proteuangelium Iacobi	Johannes Oporinus	Basel	Edited by Michael Neander in his Catechesis Martini Lutheri parva graeco-latina.
1565	Nemesius, De Natura Hominis	Christophe Plantin	Antwerp	
1565	Moschus, In Amorem Fugitivum	Hubertus Goltzius	Bruges	Edited by Adolphus Mekerchus in his edition of Greek bucolic idylls.
1566	Georgius Cedrenus		Basel	Edited by Guilielmus Xylander.
1567	Hipparchus, In Arati et Eudoxi Phaenomena commentarium		Florence	Edited by Petrus Victorius.
1567	Achilles Tatius, Isagoge ad Arati Phaenomena		Florence	Edited by Petrus Victorius.
1568	Cleanthes, Hymnus in Jovem		Antwerp	Edited by Fulvius Ursinus. The hymn with printed in a selection containing other Greek samples of lyric, elegiac and pastoral poetry.
1568	Eunapius, De vitis sophistarum		Antwerp	Edited by Junius Hadrianus.
1568	Antoninus Liberalis, Metamorphoses	Thomas Guarini	Basel	Edited by Guilhelmus Xylander.
1568	Phlegon Trallensis, De mirabilis and Longaevus	Thomas Guarini	Basel	Edited by Guilhelmus Xylander.
1568	Apollonius Dyscolus, Mirabilia	Thomas Guarini	Basel	Edited by Guilhelmus Xylander.
1569	Nonnus, Dionysiaca	Christophorus Plantinus	Antwerp	Edited by Gerartus Falkenburgius.
1569	Palladius Helenopolitanus, De gentibus Indiae et Bragmanibus		Leipzig	Edited by Joachim Camerarius in his Libellus gnomologicus.
1569	Apocalypsis pseudo-Methodii	H. Petri	Basel	Edited by Johann Jakob Grynaeus
1570	Dialexeis	Henricus Stephanus	Paris	Henri Estienne added the anonymous treatise, better known as Dissoi logoi, in appendix to his edition of Diogenes Laërtius.
1570	Alexander Trallianus, De lumbricis	Paolo & Antonio Meietti	Venice	Edited by Hieronymus Mercurialis.
1572	Plutarch	Henricus Stephanus	Geneva	
1572	Autolycus Pitanaeus, De ortu et occasu siderum		Strasbourg	Edited by Conradus Dasypodius in Theodosius Opera.
1573	Heliodorus Larissaeus, Capita opticorum	Juntine Press	Florence	Edited by Egnatius Dantes together with a Latin translation.
1580	Plotinus, Enneades	Petrus Perna	Basel	With a Latin translation of Marsilio Ficino.
1580	Porphryrius, Vita Plotini	Petrus Perna	Basel	With a Latin translation of Marsilio Ficino.
1583	Hierocles Alexandrinus	Nicolas Nivelle	Paris	
1586	Dionysius Halicanasseus, De Thucydide	Johann Wechel	Frankfurt	Edited by Fridericus Sylburgius. Contained in an edition of Dionysius' opera omnia.
1587	Ps.-Epiphanius, Physiologus		Rome	Edited by Consalus Ponce de León
1587	Origenes, Hexapla		Rome	Edited by Petrus Morinus under the form of hexaplar scholia to the Sixtine Septuagint. Morinus' work was expanded by Johannes Drusus in Arnhem in 1622 and by Lambertus Bos in Franeker in 1709; these works were superseded by Bernardus de Montfaucon's edition in Paris in 1713, in which he gathered in two volumes the surviving fragments of the Hexapla.
1588	Constantinus Porphyrogenitus, De thematibus	Christophe Plantin	Leiden	Edited by Bonaventura Vulcanius.
1589	Heraclides Creticus, De urbis in Graecia	Henricus Stephanus	Geneva	These four excerpts were erroneously attributed to Dicaearchus.
1589	Dionysius Calliphontis, Desciptio Graeciae	Henricus Stephanus	Geneva	These four excerpts were erroneously attributed to Dicaearchus.
1589	Polyaenus, Stratagemata	Jean de Tournes	Lyon	Edited by Isaac Casaubon.
1590	Geminus, Elementa Astronomiae		Altdorf	Edited by Edo Hildericus together with a Latin translation.
1592	Epistula ad Diognetum	Henricus Stephanus	Paris	Edited under the title Justini philosophi et martyris Epistula ad Diognetum et Oratio ad Graecos, the volume also contains Justin Martyr's Oratio ad Graecos. p. 48
1592	Ps.-Iustinus Martyr, Oratio ad Graecos	Henricus Stephanus	Paris	Edited under the title Justini philosophi et martyris Epistula ad Diognetum et Oratio ad Graecos, the volume also contains Justin Martyr's Oratio ad Graecos. p. 48
1593	Ps.-Andronicus, De affectibus		Augsburg	Edited by David Hoeschelius.
1594	Agathias, Historiae	Plantin Press	Leiden	Edited by Bonaventura Vulcanius.
1596	Andreas Caesariensis, Commentarii in Apocalypsin		Heidelberg	Edited by Fridericus Sylburgius.
1597	Theophylactus Simocatta, Quaestiones physicae	Plantin Press	Leiden	Edited by Bonaventura Vulcanius.
1597	Cassius Iatrosophista, Quaestiones medicae	Plantin Press	Leiden	Edited by Bonaventura Vulcanius.
1598	Iamblichus, De vita Pythagorae and Protrepticus		Heidelberg	Edited by Joannes Arcerius Theodoretus.
1598	Longus, Daphnis et Chloe	Juntine Press	Florence	Edited by Raphael Columbanius.
1598–1599	Onasander, Strategica	Abrahamus Saugranius	Paris	Edited by Nicolaus Rigaltius.
1600	Ps.-Scylax, Periplus		Augsburg	Edited by David Hoeschelius in his Geographica.
1600	Ps.-Scymnus, Periegesis		Augsburg	Edited by David Hoeschelius in his Geographica.
1600	Marcianus Heracleensis, Periplus maris exteri		Augsburg	Edited by David Hoeschelius in his Geographica.
1600	Marcianus Heracleensis, Menippei Peripli Epitome		Augsburg	Edited by David Hoeschelius in his Geographica.
1600	Isidorus Characenus, Stathmi Parthici		Augsburg	Edited by David Hoeschelius in his Geographica.

=== 17th century ===
Date	Author, Work	Printer	Location	Comment
1601	Photius, Bibliotheca		Augsburg	Edited by David Hoeschelius.
1601	Achilles Tatius	I. & N. Bonnvitius	Heidelberg	Printed together with Longus' Daphnis and Chloe and Parthenius' Erotica Pathemata.
1602	Origenes, Epistula ad Iulium Africanum		Augsburg	Edited by David Hoeschelius as part of an edition titled Adriani Isagoge, Sacrarum Litterarum et antiquissimorum Graecorum in prophetas fragmenta. The volume contained only the very beginning of Origen's letter; a further fragment was published in London in 1637 by Patricius Junius. Origen's complete letter was eventually edited by Johannes Rodolfus Wetstenius in Basel in 1674 together with Origen's Exhortatio ad martyrium and a Pseudo-Origenian dialogue.
1602	Julius Africanus, Epistula ad Origenem		Augsburg	Edited by David Hoeschelius as part of an edition titled Adriani Isagoge, Sacrarum Litterarum et antiquissimorum Graecorum in prophetas fragmenta. The volume contained only the very beginning of Origen's letter; a further fragment was published in London in 1637 by Patricius Junius. Origen's complete letter was eventually edited by Johannes Rodolfus Wetstenius in Basel in 1674 together with Origen's Exhortatio ad martyrium and a Pseudo-Origenian dialogue.
1604	Constantinus Porphyrogenitus, Excerpta de legationibus	Ad insigne pinus	Augsburg	Edited by David Hoeschelius.
1604	Theophylactus Simocatta, Historiae		Ingolstadt	Edited by Jacobus Pontanus.
1604	Gregorius Thaumaturgus		Mainz	Edited by Gerardus Vossius in the Thaumaturge's Opera omnia under the title Sancti Gregorii episcopi Neocaesariensis, cognomento Thaumaturgi, opera omnia. Among other works this edition included for the first time the In Origenem oratio panegyrica. Vossius also added Gregory of Nyssa's De vita Gregorii Thaumaturgi.
1604	Ps.-Gregorius Thaumaturgus, De fide capitula duodecim, Disputatio de anima ad Tatianum, Homilia I in annuntiationem Virginis Mariae, Homilia II in annuntiationem Virginis Mariae, Fides secundum partem and Homilia I in sancta theophania		Mainz	Edited by Gerardus Vossius in the Thaumaturge's Opera omnia under the title Sancti Gregorii episcopi Neocaesariensis, cognomento Thaumaturgi, opera omnia. Among other works this edition included for the first time the In Origenem oratio panegyrica. Vossius also added Gregory of Nyssa's De vita Gregorii Thaumaturgi.
1604	Gregorius Nyssenus, De vita Gregorii Thaumaturgi		Mainz	Edited by Gerardus Vossius in the Thaumaturge's Opera omnia under the title Sancti Gregorii episcopi Neocaesariensis, cognomento Thaumaturgi, opera omnia. Among other works this edition included for the first time the In Origenem oratio panegyrica. Vossius also added Gregory of Nyssa's De vita Gregorii Thaumaturgi.
1605	Cyrillus Alexandrinus, Adversus antropomorphitas	Plantin Press	Leiden	Edited by Bonaventura Vulcanius, it had not been previously included in Cyril's Opera omnia.
1605	Origenes, Contra Celsum		Augsburg	Edited by David Hoeschelius. To Origen's work Hoeschel adds Gregorius Thaumaturgus' Address to Origen.
1606	Nicephorus, Chronologia Compendiaria	Thomas Basson	Leiden	Edited by Joseph Justus Scaliger in his Thesaurus Temporum.
1607	Ps.-Andronicus, Aristotelis Ethicorum Nicomacheorum Paraphrasis		Leiden	Edited by Daniël Heinsius.
1607	Procopius Caesariensis, Bella	Ad insigne pinus	Augsburg	Edited by David Hoeschelius. Summaries of Procopius' De Aedificiis were also contained.
1608	Basilius Seleucensis, De vita et miraculis Sanctae Theclae	Jan Moretus	Antwerp	Edited by Pierre Pantin together with a Vita of Saint Thecla by Symeon Metaphrastes.
1609	Aeneas Tacticus		Paris	Edited by Isaac Casaubon who appended it to his edition of Polybius.
1609	Paralipomena Jeremiae		Venice	The short form of the text was published as part of the Greek Menaion.
1610	Anna Comnena, Alexias	Ad insigne pinus	Augsburg	Edited by David Hoeschelius.
1611	Constantinus Porphyrogenitus, De administrando imperio		Leiden	Edited by Johannes Meursius.
1612	Joannes Chrysostomus	John Norton	Eton	Edited by Sir Henry Saville.
1612	Diogenianus, Proverbia		Antwerp	Edited by Andreas Schott.
1612	Leo Sapiens, Tactica		Leiden	Edited by Johannes Meursius.
1615	Chronicon Paschale		Munich	Edited by Matthaeus Raderus.
1616	Nicephorus, Breviarium historicum		Paris	Edited by D. Petavius.
1616	Alypius Musicus, Introductio musica	Ludovicus Elzevierius	Leiden	Edited by Johannes Meursius in his Aristoxenus, Nicomachus, Alypius, auctores musices antiquissimi hactenus non editi.
1616	Aristoxenus, Elementa harmonica	Ludovicus Elzevierius	Leiden	Edited by Johannes Meursius in his Aristoxenus, Nicomachus, Alypius, auctores musices antiquissimi hactenus non editi.
1616	Nicomachus Gerasenus, Harmonices manuale	Ludovicus Elzevierius	Leiden	Edited by Johannes Meursius in his Aristoxenus, Nicomachus, Alypius, auctores musices antiquissimi hactenus non editi.
1617–1618	Eustathius Macrembolites, Hysmine and Hysminias		Paris	Edited by Gilbert Gaulmin.
1618	Proclus, Theologia Platonica and Elementatio Theologica		Hamburg	Edited with Latin translation by Aemilius Portus. The volume also contains Marinus' life of Proclus.
1618	Michael Glycas, Chronicon		Leiden	Edited by Johannes Meursius. Only the first part of the text was printed.
1618	Origenes, Philocalia		Paris	Edited by Joannes Tarinus. This is a 4th-century anthology made by Basil the Great and Gregory of Nazianzus. Tarinus also added to these works the Opiniones de Anima which he had found in another manuscript of the Philocalia.
1618	Zacharias Rhetor, Ammonius sive de mundi opificio disputatio		Paris	Edited by Joannes Tarinus. This is a 4th-century anthology made by Basil the Great and Gregory of Nazianzus. Tarinus also added to these works the Opiniones de Anima which he had found in another manuscript of the Philocalia.
1620	Ptolemaeus, De Planetarum Hypothesibus	William Jones	London	Edited by John Bainbridge.
1621	Sextus Empiricus, Adversus Mathematicos and Pyrroniae Hypotyposes	Petrus and Jacobus Chouet	Geneva	
1621	Diophantus, Arithmetica	Sebastianus Cramoisy	Paris	Edited by C. G. Bachetus.
1623	Procopius Caesariensis, Arcana Historia		Lyon	Edited by Nicolò Alemanni.
1623	Bacchius, Introductio musica	Sebastianus Cramoisy	Paris	Edited by Marinus Mersennus in his Quaestiones celeberrimae in Genesim, i.e. in a commentary on the Book of Genesis.
1623	Clemens Alexandrinus, Quis Dives Salvetur		Lyon	Edited by Michael Ghislerius as part of his In Jeremiam prophetam commentarii. Only eight of Origen's homilies were published in this edition; the other surviving homilies on Jeremiah written by Origen were first published in 1648 in Antwerp by Balthasar Corderius, who mistakenly attributed them to Cyril of Alexandria.
1623	Origenes, Homiliae in Ieremiam		Lyon	Edited by Michael Ghislerius as part of his In Jeremiam prophetam commentarii. Only eight of Origen's homilies were published in this edition; the other surviving homilies on Jeremiah written by Origen were first published in 1648 in Antwerp by Balthasar Corderius, who mistakenly attributed them to Cyril of Alexandria.
1625	Theodorus Prodromus, De Rhodanthe et Dosiclis amoribus		Paris	Edited by Gilbert Gaulmin.
1625	Euclides, Data		Paris	Edited by Claudius Hardy with a Latin translation.
1625	Marinus, Commentarius		Paris	Edited by Claudius Hardy with a Latin translation.
1626	Psalmi Salomonis		Lyon	Edited by Ioannes Ludovicus de la Cerda. The Psalms are contained as an appendix in a work entitled Adversaria sacra, opus varium ac veluti fax ad lucem quam multorum locorum utriusque Instrumenti, Patrumque et Scriptorum quorumcunque.
1626	Ps.-Themistocles, Epistolae		Rome	Edited by Johannes Mathaeus Caryophilos.
1629	Origenes, Homilia in Librum primum Regum 28	Laurentius Durand	Lyon	Edited by Leo Allatius under the title S. P. N. Eustathii archiepiscopi Antiocheni, et martyris, In Hexahemeron Commentarius: ac De Engastrimytho dissertatio adversus Origenem. Item Origenis De eadem Engastrimytho.
1629	Eustathius Antiochenus, De engastrimytho contra Origenem	Laurentius Durand	Lyon	Edited by Leo Allatius under the title S. P. N. Eustathii archiepiscopi Antiocheni, et martyris, In Hexahemeron Commentarius: ac De Engastrimytho dissertatio adversus Origenem. Item Origenis De eadem Engastrimytho.
1629	Ps.-Eustathius Antiochenus, Commentarius in hexaemeron	Laurentius Durand	Lyon	Edited by Leo Allatius under the title S. P. N. Eustathii archiepiscopi Antiocheni, et martyris, In Hexahemeron Commentarius: ac De Engastrimytho dissertatio adversus Origenem. Item Origenis De eadem Engastrimytho.
1630	Joannes Philoponus, De opificio mundi		Vienna	Edited by Balthasar Corderius.
1630	Ptolemaeus, Phaseis	Sébastien Cramoisy	Paris	Edited by D. Petavius.
1633	Clemens Romanus, 1 Clemens		Oxford	Edited by Patricius Junius. Young's edition was made from the Codex Alexandrinus which suffered from lacunae that involved both of the epistles. The later retrieval of the Codex Hierosolymitanus consented to the publication by Philotheos Bryennios in 1875 in Constantinople of a new edition which contained the two intact texts attributed to Clement.
1633	Ps.-Clemens Romanus, 2 Clemens		Oxford	Edited by Patricius Junius. Young's edition was made from the Codex Alexandrinus which suffered from lacunae that involved both of the epistles. The later retrieval of the Codex Hierosolymitanus consented to the publication by Philotheos Bryennios in 1875 in Constantinople of a new edition which contained the two intact texts attributed to Clement.
1633	Polycarpus, Epistola ad Philippenses		Douai	Edited by Petrus Halloisius in his Illustrium Ecclesiae Orientalis Scriptorum Vitae et Documenta.
1637	Ps.-Socrates Atheniensis, Epistolae	Sebastianus Cramoisy	Paris	Edited by Leo Allatius under the title Socratis Antisthenis et aliorum Socraticorum epistulae, these form the epistolary corpus known as Socratic letters.
1637	Ps.-Speusippus, Epistolae	Sebastianus Cramoisy	Paris	Edited by Leo Allatius under the title Socratis Antisthenis et aliorum Socraticorum epistulae, these form the epistolary corpus known as Socratic letters.
1637	Ps.-Aristippus, Epistolae	Sebastianus Cramoisy	Paris	Edited by Leo Allatius under the title Socratis Antisthenis et aliorum Socraticorum epistulae, these form the epistolary corpus known as Socratic letters.
1637	Ps.-Aeschines Socraticus, Epistolae	Sebastianus Cramoisy	Paris	Edited by Leo Allatius under the title Socratis Antisthenis et aliorum Socraticorum epistulae, these form the epistolary corpus known as Socratic letters.
1637	Ps.-Xenophon, Epistolae	Sebastianus Cramoisy	Paris	Edited by Leo Allatius under the title Socratis Antisthenis et aliorum Socraticorum epistulae, these form the epistolary corpus known as Socratic letters.
1638	Sallustius, De diis et de mundo		Rome	Edited by Leo Allatius.
1640	Philo Paradoxographus, De Septem Orbis Spectaculis		Rome	Edited by Leo Allatius.
1644	Arrianus, Cynegeticus	Sebastianus Cramoisy	Paris	Edited by Lucas Holstenius.
1644	Theon Smyrnaeus, Expositio rerum mathematicarum ad legendum Platonem utilium		Paris	The first part On Arithmetic and Music was edited by Ismaël Boulliau in 1644 and the second part On Astronomy, by Thomas-Henri Martin in 1849.
1645	Ps.-Barnabas, Epistula		Paris	Edited by Hugues Ménard under the title Sancti Barnabae apostoli (ut fertur) epistola catholica. Due to defective manuscripts, this edition only started from chapter 5.7 of the epistle; it was only following the retrieval of the Codex Sinaiticus that Constantin von Tischendorf edited the complete text in 1862.
1647	Martyrium Polycarpi		London	Edited by James Ussher in his Appendix Ignatiana.
1652	Joannes Cinnamus, Historiae		Utrecht	Edited by Cornelius Tollius.
1652	Aristides Quintilianus, De musica	Lodewijk Elzevir	Amsterdam	Edited by Marcus Meibomius in his Antiquae musicae auctores septem together with Aristoxenus, Nicomachus, Bacchius and Cleonides.
1652	Gaudentius Philosophus, Harmonica introductio	Lodewijk Elzevir	Amsterdam	Edited by Marcus Meibomius in his Antiquae musicae auctores septem together with Aristoxenus, Nicomachus, Bacchius and Cleonides.
1655	Ps.-Codinus, Excerpta de antiquitatibus Constantinopolitanis		Paris	Edited by Petrus Lambecius.
1655	Theophanes, Chronographia		Paris	Edited by Jacques Goar.
1656	Methodius Olympius, Convivium decem virginum		Rome	Edited by Leo Allatius. Extracts had previously been published by François Combefis in Paris in 1644, availing himself of what was present in Photius' Bibliothetca.
1657	Hypsicles, De Ascensionibus	Sebastianus Cramoisy	Paris	Edited by J. Mentelius.
1661	Hippolytus Romanus, De Christo et Antichristo		Paris	Edited by Marquardus Gudius.
1663	Ptolemaeus, De iudicandi facultate and Inscriptio Canobi	Sébastien Cramoisy	Paris	Edited by Ismaël Boulliau.
1664	Arrianus, Tactica and Acies contra Alanos	Henricus Curio	Uppsala	Edited by Johannes Schefferus.
1664	Mauritius, Strategicon	Henricus Curio	Uppsala	Edited by Johannes Schefferus.
1668	Iamblichus, In Nicomachi Gerasini arithmeticam introductionem		Arnhem	Edited by Samuel Tennulius.
1668	Origenes, In Matthaeum and In Joannem		Rouen	Edited by Petrus Daniel Huetius under the title Origenis in sacras Scripturas Commentaria quaecunque Graece reperiri potuerunt. As for the Late antique Latin Vetus interpretatio of the In Matthaeum, which contain books that have not survived in the Greek original, they had been already published by Jacques Merlin in Paris in 1512.
1670	Paulus Silentiarius, Descriptio Sanctae Sophiae		Paris	Edited by Charles du Fresne, sieur du Cange together with his edition of Joannes Cinnamus' Historia as part of the series Corpus Byzantinae Historiae.
1671	Agathemerus, Geographiae informatio		Amsterdam	Edited by Samuel Tennulius in his Agathemeris libri duo
1671	Hypotyposis geographiae		Amsterdam	Edited by Samuel Tennulius in his Agathemeris libri duo
1671	Diagnosis geographiae		Amsterdam	Edited by Samuel Tennulius in his Agathemeris libri duo
1672	Ps.-Clemens Romanus, Homiliae XX		Paris	Edited by Jean-Baptiste Cotelier in his SS. Patrum qui temporibus apostolicis floruerunt. The edition is incomplete since Cotelier used the Codex Parisinus graecus 930 which contains the twenty homilies only those from 1 to 19a, thus having only part of homily 19 and lacking completely homily 20. It was only in 1853 that a complete text was published in Göttingen by A. R. M. Dressel thanks to the retrieval of the Codex Ottobonianus graecus 443. Cotelier also inserted in his collection the Shepherd of Hermas, using the ancient Latin translation together with the few Greek excerpts that were available at the time. Things changed in 1855 when the almost complete Codex Athous was found by the forger Constantine Simonides who made a transcription with a counterfeit ending and several made-up interpolations. This script was given to Rudolf Anger who published it in Leipzig in 1856. In 1887 another edition was made in Leipzig by Oscar von Gebhardt and Adolf von Harnack, but mostly using Simonides transcription, albeit an uncounterfeited one. Eventually, in 1880 Spyridon Lambros collated the manuscript's leaves, opening the road to Armitage Robinson's edition in 1888.
1672	Hermas, Pastor Hermae		Paris	
1672	Ps.-Eratosthenes, Catasterismi		Oxford	Edited by John Fell
1674	Origenes, Exhortatio ad Martyrium		Basel	Edited by Johannes Rodolfus Wetstenius with the title Origenis Dialogus contra Marcionitas, sive de recta ίn Deum fide: Exhortatio ad Martyrium: Responsum ad Africani Epistolam de historia Susannae. In this volume is also contained for the first time Origen's complete letter to Julius Africanus.
1674	Ps.-Origenes, De recta in Deum fide		Basel	Edited by Johannes Rodolfus Wetstenius with the title Origenis Dialogus contra Marcionitas, sive de recta ίn Deum fide: Exhortatio ad Martyrium: Responsum ad Africani Epistolam de historia Susannae. In this volume is also contained for the first time Origen's complete letter to Julius Africanus.
1678	Iamblichus, De Mysteriis Aegyptiorum	Oxford University Press	Oxford	Edited by Thomas Gale.
1682	Ptolemaeus, Harmonica		Oxford	Edited by Johannes Wallis together with Porphyry's commentary to Ptolemy.
1682	Porphyrius, Commentarius in Claudii Ptolemaei Harmonica		Oxford	Edited by Johannes Wallis together with Porphyry's commentary to Ptolemy.
1686	Origenes, De oratione		Oxford	Edited anonymously by Thomas Gale.
1688	Aristarchus Samius, De magnitudinibus et distantiis solis et lunae		Oxford	Edited by Johannes Wallis. Wallis only published what is left of Pappus' Book II of the Mathematical Collection, most of which Book is lost. Extensive parts of Book VII were edited in Oxford in 1706 and 1710 by Edmond Halley; similarly, Hermann J. Eisenmann printed part of Book V in Paris in 1824. In Halle in 1871 C. J. Gerhardt planned a complete edition of Pappus, but only Books VII and VIII reached publication. The first complete printed edition of the Collection was published in three volumes in Berlin between 1876 and 1878, edited by Friedrich Hultsch.
1688	Pappus, Collectio		Oxford	
1689	Martyrium Ignatii	Franciscus Muguet	Paris	Edited by Thierry Ruinart in his Acta Primorum Martyrum sincera et selecta. Ruinart's work also contains the editio princeps of Ignatius' Epistola ad Romanos.
1691	Joannes Malalas, Chronographia	Theatro Sheldoniano	Oxford	Edited by Edmund Chilmead.
1692	Olympiodorus Alexandrinus, Vita Platonis	Henricus Wetstein	Amsterdam	Edited by Marcus Meibomius. As part of Wetstein's edition of Diogenes Laërtius, the printer added Olympiodorus' work, taken from papers left by Isaac Casaubon.
1693	Athenaeus Mechanicus, De machinis		Paris	Edited by Melchisédech Thévenot.
1693	Biton, De constructione bellicarum machinarum et catapultarum		Paris	Edited by Melchisédech Thévenot.
1693	Heron Alexandrinus, Automata, Belopoeica and Pneumatica		Paris	Edited by Melchisédech Thévenot.
1695	Martyrium Iustini et sociorum		Antwerp	Three versions of the text exist; the first one to be printed was the so-called middle recension, edited by Daniel Papebroch in the Acta Sanctorum. This one was followed by the longer one, edited by Pio Franchi de' Cavalieri in Rome in 1902 in the Nuove note agiografiche. The shorter version was eventually printed in 1920 by the same Franchi de' Cavalieri in another edition of the Note Agiografiche.
1698	Testamenta XII. Patriarcharum	Oxford University Press	Oxford	Edited by Johann Ernst Grabe as part of the Spicilegium SS. Patrum, ut haereticorum.
1698	Acta Pauli et Theclae	Oxford University Press	Oxford	Edited by Johann Ernst Grabe as part of the Spicilegium SS. Patrum, ut haereticorum.
1698	Acta Barnabae apostoli	P. Jacobs	Antwerp	edited by Daniel Papebroch and contained in the Acta Sanctorum.
1698	Euangelium Thomae de infantia Saluatoris	Huguetanorum sumtibus	Antwerp	Only a small part of the text was published by Richard Simon in his Nouvelles observations sur le texte et les versions du Nouveau Testament. The gospel was completely published and edited in Antwerp in 1698 by Jean-Baptiste Cotelier.

=== 18th century ===
Date	Author, Work	Printer	Location	Comment
1703	Euclides, Phaenomena		Oxford	Edited by David Gregory in his edition of Euclid's complete works. Also contains a translation by the same Gregory.
1706	Cosmas Indicopleustes, Topographia Christiana		Paris	Edited by Bernard de Montfaucon in his Collectio Nova Patrum et Scriptorum Graecorum. pp. 2, 330.
1710	Apollonius Pergaeus, Conica		Oxford	Edited by Edmond Halley.
1710	Serenus Antissensis, De sectione cylindri and De sectione coni		Oxford	Edited by Edmond Halley.
1715	Proemium in artem rhetoricam		Paris	Edited by Bernard de Montfaucon.
1715	Dionysius Thrax, Ars Grammatica		Hamburg	Edited by Johannes Albertus Fabricius as volume vii of his Bibliotheca Graeca.
1718	Hippolytus, Contra Noetum	Christian Liebezeit	Hamburg	Edited by Johannes Albertus Fabricius in the second volume of Hippolytus' works under the title S. Hippolyti episcopi et martyris opera et fragmenta.
1719	Anaphora Pilati		Hamburg	Edited by Johannes Albertus Fabricius together with other apocrypha in the second volume of his Codex Apochryphus Novi Testamenti.
1726	Xenophon Ephesius, Ephesiaca		London	Edited by Antonio Cocchi. A Latin translation was inserted by the same editor.
1733	Genesius	Stephan Bergler	Venice	Edited by Johannes B. Mencken.
1749	Epistula presbyterorum et diaconorum Achaiae		Leipzig	Edited by Carolus Christianus Woog.
1750	Chariton, De amoribus Chaereae et Calliroes	Petrus Mortier	Amsterdam	Edited by Jacques Philippe d'Orville with a Latin translation.
1754	Vita Secundi philosophi		Leipzig	Edited by Johann Adam Schier, who omitted the part of the text containing emperor Hadrian's "Questions". The latter had been previously edited by Lucas Holstenius in 1638 in Rome.
1768	Aelius Aristides, In aquam Pergami oratio		Florence	Edited by Angelo Maria Bandini in his Catalogus Codicum Graecorum Bibliothecae Mediceae Laurentianae II. This oration (Oratio LIII) has come down to us incomplete but it was partially integrated in 1825 in Rome by Angelo Mai who added to it in his Scriptorum Veterum Nova Collectio e Vaticanis Codicibus Edita I.
1769	Stadiasmus Maris Magni		Madrid	Edited by Joannes Iriarte in Regiae Bibliothecae Matritensis Codices Graeci.
1769	Polybius Rhetor, De soloecismo, De Acyrologia and De Speciebus Orationis		Madrid	Edited by Joannes Iriarte in Regiae Bibliothecae Matritensis Codices Graeci.
1772–1776	Anthologia Palatina		Strasbourg	Edited by R. F. P. Brunck that for the first time printed the full content of the anthology. Brunck modified radically the order of the epigrams in the manuscript arranging them instead by author.
1773	Archimedes, Problema Bovinum	Zweiter Beitrag	Braunschweig	Edited by G. E. Lessing.
1777	Anthemius of Tralles, De machinis paradoxis	Imprimerie royale	Paris	Edited by Louis Dupuy.
1780	Hymnus in Cererem		Leyden	Edited by David Ruhnken. One of the Hymni Homerici.
1781	Iamblichus, De generali mathaematum scientia	typis et sumptibus fratrum Coleti	Venice	Contained in the Anecdota Graeca prepared by Jean-Baptiste-Gaspard d'Ansse de Villoison.
1785	Aelius Aristides, Adversus Leptinem declamatio		Venice	Edited by Jacopo Morelli in a volume titled Aristidis oratio adversus Leptinem, Libanii declamatio pro Socrate, Aristoxeni rhythmicorum elementorum fragmenta. The book also contains Aristoxenus.
1785	Libanius, De Socratis silentio		Venice	Edited by Jacopo Morelli in a volume titled Aristidis oratio adversus Leptinem, Libanii declamatio pro Socrate, Aristoxeni rhythmicorum elementorum fragmenta. The book also contains Aristoxenus.
1790	Hermogenes, Progymnasmata		Göttingen	Edited by Arnold Heeren. Heeren only published parts viii and ix of Hermogenes' work, which was completely printed in 1812 in Nuremberg by G. Veesenmeyer.
1794	Joannes Lydus, De Mensibus	Libraria Weidmannia	Leipzig	Edited by Niels Iversen Schow

=== 19th century ===
Date	Author, Work	Printer	Location	Comment
1804	Acta Pilati		Copenhagen	Edited by Andreas Birch in the collection titled Auctarium codicis apocryphi Novi Testamenti Fabriciani.
1804	Paradosis Pilati		Copenhagen	Edited by Andreas Birch in the collection titled Auctarium codicis apocryphi Novi Testamenti Fabriciani.
1804	1 Apocalypsis Iohannis apocrypha		Copenhagen	Edited by Andreas Birch in the collection titled Auctarium codicis apocryphi Novi Testamenti Fabriciani.
1810	Hermias Alexandrinus, In Platonis Phaedrum scholia		Leipzig	Edited by Georg Anton Friedrich Ast.
1811	Apollonius Dyscolus, De pronomine		Berlin	Edited by Immanuel Bekker.
1812	Joannes Lydus, De Magistratibus		Paris	Edited by Carl Benedict Hase
1816	Apollonius Dyscolus, De adverbio and de disiunctivis		Berlin	Edited by Immanuel Bekker in the second volume of the Anecdota Graeca.
1820	Damascius, In Platonis Philebum Commentaria		Leipzig	Edited by Johann Gottfried Stallbaum.
1820	Proclus, In Platonis Alcibiadem Priorem Commentarii	Officina Broennerianna	Frankfurt	Edited by Georg Friedrich Creuzer.
1820	Proclus, In Platonis Cratylum Scholia	A. G. Weigel & J. Luchtmans	Leipzig and Leiden	Edited by Jean François Boissonade.
1820	Ps.-Arcadius, De accentibus		Leipzig	Edited by Edmund Henry Barker. An epitome of Herodian's lost De prosodia catholica.
1820-1827	Proclus	J. M. Eberhart (voll. I-V) & F. Didot (vol. VI)	Paris	Edited by Victor Cousin in six volumes. This publication contains' Proclus first printed edition of his Commentary on the Parmenides. In 1827 in the sixth volume was added Damascius' Commentary.
1820-1827	Damascius, In Parmenidem commentaria	J. M. Eberhart (voll. I-V) & F. Didot (vol. VI)	Paris	Edited by Victor Cousin in six volumes. This publication contains' Proclus first printed edition of his Commentary on the Parmenides. In 1827 in the sixth volume was added Damascius' Commentary.
1821	Ps.-Alexander Aphrodisiensis, De Febribus		Cambridge	Edited by D. G. Schinas in the Museum Criticum Cantabrigiese.
1821	Olympiodorus Alexandrinus, In Platonis Alcibiadem Priorem Commentaria		Frankfurt	Edited by Georg Friedrich Creuzer.
1823	Joannes Lydus, De Ostentis		Paris	Edited by Carl Benedict Hase
1823	Acta Thomae	F. C. G. Vogelius	Leipzig	Edited by Johannes Carolus Thilo.
1825	Aelius Aristides, Pro Leptine declamatio		Rome	Edited by Angelo Mai in the volume titled Scriptorum Veterum Nova Collectio e Vaticanis Codicibus Edita I.
1825	Joannes Philoponus, Praecepta Tonica		Leipzig	Edited by Karl Wilhelm Dindorf.
1826	Damascius, Quaestiones de primis principiis	H. L. Broenner	Frankfurt	Edited by J. Kopp, only part of the text was published. It was in 1889 that the full text was published by C. A. Ruelle.
1827	De scientia politica dialogus		Rome	Edited by Angelo Mai in his Scriptorum veterum nova collectio e Vaticanis codicibus edita II. It was found in the Vatican Library in a palimpsest which had been written over with material from Aelius Aristides. A further fragment which is from this dialogue was found later and published in 1974 by C. A. Behr.
1830	Galenus, De musculorum dissectione		Leipzig	Edited by Karl Gottlob Kühn in the eighteenth volume of Galen's Opera omnia.
1831	Ps.-Herodianus Grammaticus, De soloecismo et barbarismo	Excusum in Regio typographeo	Paris	Edited by Jean François Boissonade in the third volume of the Anecdota Graeca e codicibus regiis.
1832	Ps.-Iohannes Damascenus, Vita Barlaam et Ioasaph	Excusum in Regio typographeo	Paris	Edited by Jean François Boissonade in the fourth volume of the Anecdota Graeca e codicibus regiis.
1832	Domninus Larissensis, Enchiridion introductionis arithmeticae	Excusum in Regio typographeo	Paris	Edited by Jean François Boissonade in the fourth volume of the Anecdota Graeca e codicibus regiis.
1833	Vita Abercii	Levrault	Paris	The Vita has come down to us in four different recensions. This edition was edited by Jean François Boissonade in the fifth volume of the Anecdota Graeca e codicibus regiis. A second recension was compiled by Symeon Metaphrastes: this version was published by Benjamin Bossue in 1858 as part of the Acta Sanctorum. The third version was published by Elie Batareikh in 1904 in the journal Oriens Christianus; the fourth, instead, was edited by F. Halkin in Brussels in 1963 under the Inédits byzantins d’Ochrida, Candie et Moscou.
1833	Testamentum Iobi	Typis Collegii urbani	Rome	Edited by Angelo Mai
1836	Alexander Aphrodisiensis, Commentaria in Aristotelis Metaphysica		Berlin	Edited by Christian August Brandis in 1836 in Berlin by Christian August Brandis in the fourth volume of Aristotle's complete works, which goes under the title Scholia in Aristotelem. This volume contains many extracts from several commentaries: concerning the Metaphysics, he used Asclepius, Syrianus and the scholia from the Codex Parisinus gr. 1853 and, obviously, Alexander. Addressing more specifically the latter, Brandis published completely Alexander's commentary to Aristotle's first five books of the Metaphysics (Books I-V) while only publishing extracts of Books VI-XII. This was due to his doubting Alexander's authorship of the second part of the commentary and instead believing it has been written by Michael of Ephesus, a view generally upheld today. The first complete edition of the commentary traditionally credited to Alexander came out in 1847 in Berlin, edited by Hermann Bonitz.
1837	Testamentum Salomonis	J.A. Barth	Leipzig	Edited by Ferdinand Florens Fleck.
1837	Ps.-Marcellus, Passio apostolorum Petri et Pauli	Orphanotrophei	Halle	Johann Karl Thilo
1839	Ioannes Philoponus, De usu astrolabii eiusque constructione		Bonn	Edited by Heinrich Hase.
1840	Anonymus Seguerianus, Ars Rhetorica		Paris	Edited by Nicolas Séguier de Saint-Brisson.
1841	Anonymus Bellermannianus, Scriptio de musica		Berlin	Edited by Johann Friedrich Bellermann.
1846	Ps.-Callisthenes, Historia Alexandri Magni		Paris	Edited by Karl Müller together with Arrian's works. This represents the A version mixed with the B.
1847	Ps.-Alexander Aphrodisiensis, Commentaria in Aristotelis Metaphysica		Berlin	edited by Hermann Bonitz as part of his publication of the full commentary attributed to Alexander. Previously, Christian August Brandis had only printed a number of excerpts in 1836 of the second part of the commentary, i.e. Books VI-XII. Bonitz published instead the whole second part (Books VI-XIV), which is currently considered to be in its present form to have been probably authored by Michael of Ephesus.
1847	Olympiodorus Alexandrinus, In Platonis Phaedonem Commentaria		Heilbronn	Edited by Christopher Eberhard Finckh. Previously, parts of this commentary had been previously published by Nathaniel Forster in Oxford in 1752 and in a more complete form by Mystoxides and D. G. Schinas in Venice in 1816.
1848	Olympiodorus Alexandrinus, In Platonis Gorgiam Commentaria	Teubner	Leipzig	Edited by Albert Jahn in a supplementary volume to the Neue Jahrbücher für Philologie und Pädagogik.
1850	Hypereides	Parker and Bell	London	Edited from papyrus by Churchill Babington.
1851	Acta Philippi	Avenarius et Mendelssohn	Leipzig	Edited by Constantin von Tischendorf
1851	Hippolytus Romanus, Elenchus		Oxford	Edited by Emmanuel Miller.
1855	Asclepiodotus, Tactica		Leipzig	Edited by H. Köchly and W. Rüstow.
1856	Constitutiones per Hippolytum	Teubner	Leipzig	Edited by Paul de Lagarde as part of his Reliquae iuris ecclesiastici antiquissimae.
1858	Heron Alexandrinus, Dioptra	Imprimerie Impériale	Paris	Edited by A. J. H. Vincent.
1859	Dexippus, In Arirstotelis Categorias Commentaria		Munich	Edited by Leonard Spengel. A limited number of extracts had been previously edited in 1836 in Berlin by Christian August Brandis in his Scholia in Aristotelem.
1866	Greek Apocalypse of Ezra	H. Mendelssohn	Leipzig	Edited by Constantin von Tischendorf in Apocalypses apocryphae: Mosis, Esdrae, Pauli, Iohannis.
1866	Greek Apocalypse of Moses	H. Mendelssohn	Leipzig	Edited by Constantin von Tischendorf in Apocalypses apocryphae: Mosis, Esdrae, Pauli, Iohannis.
1869	Ps.-Clemens Romanus, Epitome altera		Leipzig	Edited by A. R. M. Dressel in his Clementinorum Epitomae duae which also contains the first Clementine epitome.
1877	Acta Timothei		Bonn	Edited by Hermann Usener in a collection of papers put together on the occasion of Germany's Emperor Wilhelm I's birthday.
1878	Ascensio Isaiae	Fues's Verlag	Leipzig	Edited by Oscar von Gebhardt.
1878	Ps.-Thessalus Trallianus, De virtutibus herbarum		Leipzig	The single surviving manuscript, which is incomplete, was only partially edited by Charles Graux and was completely published by Pierre Boudreaux in 1910 in Brussels. A shortened version of the text had been partially published in 1827 in Leipzig and Darmstadt by C. F. Baehr and completely edited always by Boudreaux in the same edition that contained the original version.
1883	Didache		Constantinople	Edited by Philotheos Bryennios.
1885	Autolycus Pitanaeus, De sphaera mota	B.G. Teubner	Leipzig	Edited by Friedrich Hultsch.
1891	Herodas	British Museum	London	Edited by Frederic G. Kenyon from papyrus.
1891	Aristoteles, De republica Atheniensium	British Museum	London	Edited by Frederic G. Kenyon
1892	Testamentum Abrahae	Cambridge University Press	Cambridge	Edited by M. R. James.
1892	Apocalypsis Petri and Evangelium Petri	Leroux	Paris	Edited by Urbain Bouriant from a manuscript found in Akhmim.
1892	Ps.-Sextus, Sexti Sententiae		Leipzig	Edited by Anton Elter in his Gnomica I.
1893	Quaestiones Bartholomae	Imperial University	Moscow	Edited by Athanasius Vassiliev.
1893	Vita sancti Macarii Romani	Imperial University	Moscow	Edited by Athanasius Vassiliev.
1893	Acta Xanthippae et Polyxenae	Cambridge University Press	Cambridge	Edited by M. R. James in Apocrypha Anecdota.
1893	Narratio Zosimi	Cambridge University Press	Cambridge	Edited by M. R. James in Apocrypha Anecdota.
1893	Testamentum Adae	Cambridge University Press	Cambridge	Edited by M. R. James in Apocrypha Anecdota.
1894	Anonymus Parisinus, De morbis acutis et chroniis			Partially edited by Robert Fuchs in the fiftieth volume of the Rheinisches Museum, it was only fully published in 1997 in Leiden by Ivan Garofalo.
1896	Martyrium Pionii			Edited by Oscar von Gebhardt in the 18th volume of the Archiv für slavische Philologie.
1897	Bacchylides	British Museum	Oxford	Edited by Frederic G. Kenyon from papyrus
1897	Apocalypse of Baruch (3 Baruch)	Cambridge University Press	Cambridge	Edited by M. R. James in Apocrypha Anecdota II
1900	Elias, In Aristotelis Categorias Commentaria	Reimer	Berlin	Edited by Adolf Busse. Possibly by David.

=== 20th century - present ===
Date	Author, Work	Printer	Location	Comment
1903	Heron Alexandrinus, Metrica	Teubner	Leipzig	Edited by Hermann Schöne.
1904	Heidelberg Epitome	Teubner	Leipzig	Edited by Richard Reitzentstein.
1905	Hippolytus Romanus, Chronicon	Teubner	Leipzig	Edited by A. Bauer.
1907	Archimedes, Methodus	Weidmann	Berlin	Edited by J. L. Heiberg
1910	Theophylactus Simocatta, De vitae termino		Saint Petersburg	Edited by A. Papadopoulos-Kerameus.
1911	Origenes, Scholia in Apocalypsin	Hinrichs	Leipzig	Edited by Constantin Diobouniotis and Adolf von Harnack.
1915	Archimedes, Stomachion	Teubner	Leipzig	Edited by J. L. Heiberg.
1927	Theodosius Tripolites, De diebus et noctibus and De habitationibus	Weidmann	Berlin	Edited by Rudolf Fecht.
1928	Oecumenius, Commentarius in Apocalypsin	University of Michigan Press	Ann Arbor	Edited by Herman C. Hoskier.
1928	Ioannes Sardianus, Commentarium in Aphthonii Progymnasmata	Teubner	Leipzig	Edited by H. Rabe as the 15th volume of the Rhetores Graeci.
1975	Evangelium Mani	Dr. Rudolf Habelt GmbH	Bonn	Published in four articles by Albert Henrichs and Ludwig Koenen in the Zeitschrift für Papyrologie und Epigraphik (1975–82).
2005	Galenus, De propriis placitis			Edited by Véronique Boudon-Millot and Antoine Pietrobelli in the One hundred eighteenth volume of the Revue des Études Grecques.
2015	Origenes, Homiliae in Psalmos	De Gruyter	Berlin	Edited by Lorenzo Perrone under the title Die neuen Psalmenhomilien: Eine kritische Edition des Codex Monacensis Graecus 314.
