= Apostolius =

Apostolius may refer to:

- Michael Apostolius (c. 1420–1480), Greek theologian and rhetorician of the 15th century
- Arsenius Apostolius (c. 1460–1538), one of Michael Apostolius's sons, a bishop and scholar
