= Trincavelli =

Trincavelli is an Italian surname. Notable people with the surname include:

- Franco Trincavelli (1935–1983), Italian rower
- Vittore Trincavelli (1496–1568), Italian physician, editor, and scholar
