= Gelenius =

Gelenius is a surname. Notable people with the surname include:

- Aegidius Gelenius (1595–1656), historian of Cologne
- Sigismund Gelenius (1497–1554), Czech scholar and humanist
