= Lorenzo de Alopa =

Lorenzo di Alopa, more generally known under the Latin name of Laurentius Francisci de Alopa, a native of Venice, was established as a printer of incunabula at Florence toward the end of the 15th century. His birth and death dates are unknown.

He attended chiefly to the printing of Greek books and published the Greek Anthology, edited by Janus Lascaris, with a commentary, and dedicated to Pietro de' Medici, Aug. 8, 1494, in quarto; The Hymns of Callimachus, in quarto; Gnomae Monostichae, with the poem of the Musaeum, in quarto; four tragedies of Euripides: Medea, Hippolytus, Alcestis, Andromache, small edition in quarto; the first edition (editio princeps) of the Argonautica of Apollonius of Rhodes, 1496, in quarto.

These editions are remarkable for the beauty of the paper and the elegance of the Greek type. The first edition of Marsilio Ficino's Latin translation of Plato, which contains at the end of the Symposium the name of Laurentius Venetus, is also supposed to have come from the press of Lorenzo de Alopa. This edition is printed in Gothic characters.
