= Preamble to Rhetoric =

The Preamble to Rhetoric or Prooemium in artem rhetororicam (Greek: Περὶ τῶν τῆς ῥητορικῆς προοίμιον) is an anonymous Greek treatise meant as an introduction to the art of rhetoric.

Its author is thought to have who had been a pagan who lived at the latest in the 5th century in eastern Sicily when the island was still part of the Roman Empire. That said, the latest authority he mentions is that of Dionysius of Halicarnassus and considering the nature of the piece it was most probably written in Athens in the 2nd century.

First and foremost the author presents himself as a pedagogue bent on putting in light the playfulness of rhetoric and insisting on its divine origin. It follows the traditional rhetorical structure of ten exercises. This treatise is part of a corpus developed through about twenty manuscripts forming together a corpus rhetoricum of twelve rhetorical texts from antiquity. According to the French scholar Michel Patillon, the Preamble was assembled with other works by Hermogenes, Aphthonius and Maximus towards the end of the 5th century by an unknown rhetorician.
