= David Hoeschel =

David Hoeschel (also Höschel) (Latin: Hoeschelius) (8 April 1556, Augsburg – 19 October 1617, Augsburg) was a German librarian, editor and scholar.

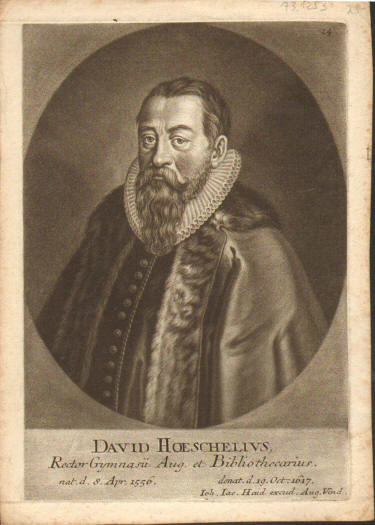
David Hoeschel, engraving by Johann Jakob Haid, c.1747.

He was a pupil of Hieronymus Wolf. While he was rector of the St. Anna Gymnasium in Augsburg, he founded in 1594 with Marcus Welser the press "Ad insigne pinus". Up to 1617 it produced about 70 works, among them being the editio princeps (i.e. first edition) of the Bibliotheca of Photius I of Constantinople.
