= Friedrich Hultsch =

German classical philologist and historian (1833–1906)

Friedrich Otto Hultsch (22 July 1833 in Dresden – 6 April 1906 in Dresden) was a German classical philologist and historian of mathematics in antiquity.

== Biography ==
After graduating from the Dresden Kreuzschule, Friedrich Hultsch studied classical philology at the University of Leipzig from 1851 to 1855. After a probationary year at the Kreuzschule, he was employed in 1857 as a second Adjunkt at the Alte Nikolaischule in Leipzig. In 1858 he became a teacher at the Zwickau Gymnasium. In 1861 Hultsch was again employed at the Kreuzschule, where he was the rector from 1868 until his retirement in 1889. From 1879 to 1882 he also headed the newly founded Wettiner Gymnasium.

Hultsch specialized in historical metrology and textual criticism concerning mathematical antiquity.

His most important works are:

- Griechische und römische Metrologie (Berlin 1862; with a substantially expanded second edition in 1882);
- the edition of Scriptores metrologici graeci et romani (Leipzig 1864–1866, 2 volumes);
- the exposition and criticism of geometry and stereometry of Heron of Alexandria (Berlin 1864);
- the mathematical collection of Pappos (Berlin 1875–1878, 3 volumes);
- the writings of Autolycus of Pitane on the moving sphere, with Hultsch's history of the rise and fall of the belief in the fixed stars (Leipzig 1885);
- edition of De die natali by Censorinus (Leipzig 1867);
- edition of the history by Polybius (Berlin 1867–1872, 4 volumes).

He wrote many articles on Greek mathematics in Pauly-Wissowa (e.g. Archimedes and Euclid).

Hultsch died in 1906 in Dresden and was buried in the Trinitatisfriedhof. He was elected a member of the Saxon Academy of Sciences of Leipzig (1885) and a corresponding member of the Göttingen Academy of Sciences and Humanities.
