= Vincent Obsopoeus =

German humanist, Latin poet, and translator (died 1539)

- Died: 1539
- Writing career
- Pen name: Vincentius Obsopoeus
- Language: Latin
- Notable works: De Arte Bibendi Diodori Siculi Historiarum Libri Aliquot, qui extant In Graecorum epigrammatum libros quatuor Annotationes longe doctissimae

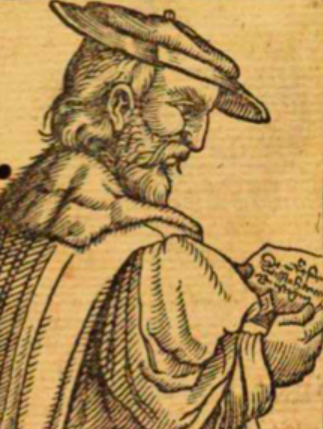
Portrait of Vincent Obsopoeus, from Heinrich Pantaleon (1566), Prosopographiae heroum atque illustrium virorum totius Germaniae, vol. 3.

Vincent Obsopoeus (or Opsopoeus) was a German humanist, Latin poet, and translator active in the Reformation. His most famous work, De Arte Bibendi (The Art of Drinking), was written and published in 1536. He published a second edition in 1537, and died in 1539.

== Biography ==
Born Vincent Heidnecker in “Vindelitia” (i.e. Bavaria), Obsopoeus was the son of a chef for local princes and the wealthy. He too began his career by training to be a chef, but fell in love with literature, and by 1526 was living in Nuremberg. He soon became active as a translator from Greek into Latin, from Latin into German, and German into Latin. He translated many of Martin Luther's works. For a number of years, Obsopoeus was rector (principal) of the classical Gymnasium in Ansbach; Albert Alcibiades was one of his students there. In 1529, he published a Latin translation of some less popular pieces by Lucian. The book includes a translation of Prodicus's fable Hercules at the Crossroads; a manuscript copy is also extant . In 1531, Philip Melanchthon, with whom he had a falling out, wrongly suspected him of writing The Pig War.

For a number of years, friends and rivals accused Obsopoeus of enjoying wine too much, and the accusation cost him several professional job opportunities. In 1536, in gleeful revenge, he wrote De Arte Bibendi, the world's first guide to drinking alcohol. In book two, Obsopoeus alludes to Lucian's dialogue Slander: A Warning to strike back at his enemies.

An early mention of De Arte Bibendi outside of Germany appeared in Olaus Magnus' 1555 work Historia de Gentibus Septentrionalibus (A Description of the Northern Peoples), which was printed in Rome. The author is there referred to as "a certain German named Vincent Obsopoeus" (p. 462). In 2020 and 2021, De Arte Bibendi was translated into English, German, Spanish, and Japanese.

In 1539, he wrote Diodori Siculi Historiarum Libri Aliquot, qui extant. He died that same year. His book In Graecorum epigrammatum libros quattuor Annotationes longe doctissimae appeared posthumously in 1540.

== Works ==
- Obsopoeus, Vincentius (transl.). 1525. Martini Lutheri Epistolarum farrago ... cum psalmorum aliquot interpretatione. Haganau: Secer. (Obsopoeus dedicates this translation to his brother Michael Obsopoeus, a preacher in Bavaria.)
- Obsopoeus, Vincentius. 1529. Elegantissima aliquot Luciani opuscula. The book contains dedicatory epistles to George of Brandenburg-Ansbach, Konrad Peutinger, Philipp Gundelius, the reader, Michael Mastaller (including an original Greek epigram), Martin Weiss, Dominick Sleupner, Georg Puecher, Christoph I Gugel, and one Tilomannus Gunderod, who was a young student of his at the time.
- Obsopoeus, Vincentius. 1534. ῾Ηλιοδώρου Αἰθιοπικών βιβλία δέκα / Heliodori Historiae Aethiopicae libri decem. Basel: Hervag. (here)
- Obsopoeus, Vincentius. 1536. De Arte Bibendi. Basel: Norimbergae.
- Obsopoeus, Vincentius. 1537. Macrobii, id est Longaevi (a translation, apparently the first into Latin, of Lucian's Octogenarians/Long-Livers). In De Senectute. Nuremberg: Joh. Petreius.
- Obsopoeus, Vincentius. 1539. Diodori Siculi Historiarum Libri Aliquot, qui extant. Basel: Johannes Oporinus. VD16 D 1826.
- Obsopoeus, Vincentius. 1540. In Graecorum epigrammatum libros quatuor Annotationes longe doctissimae. Basel: Brylingerus. VD16 O 814.

Obsopoeus contributed a 30-line epigram to the Sylva Bibliocorum Nominum of Andreas Althamer (1530).
