= Zacharias Calliergi =

Greek Renaissance humanist and scholar

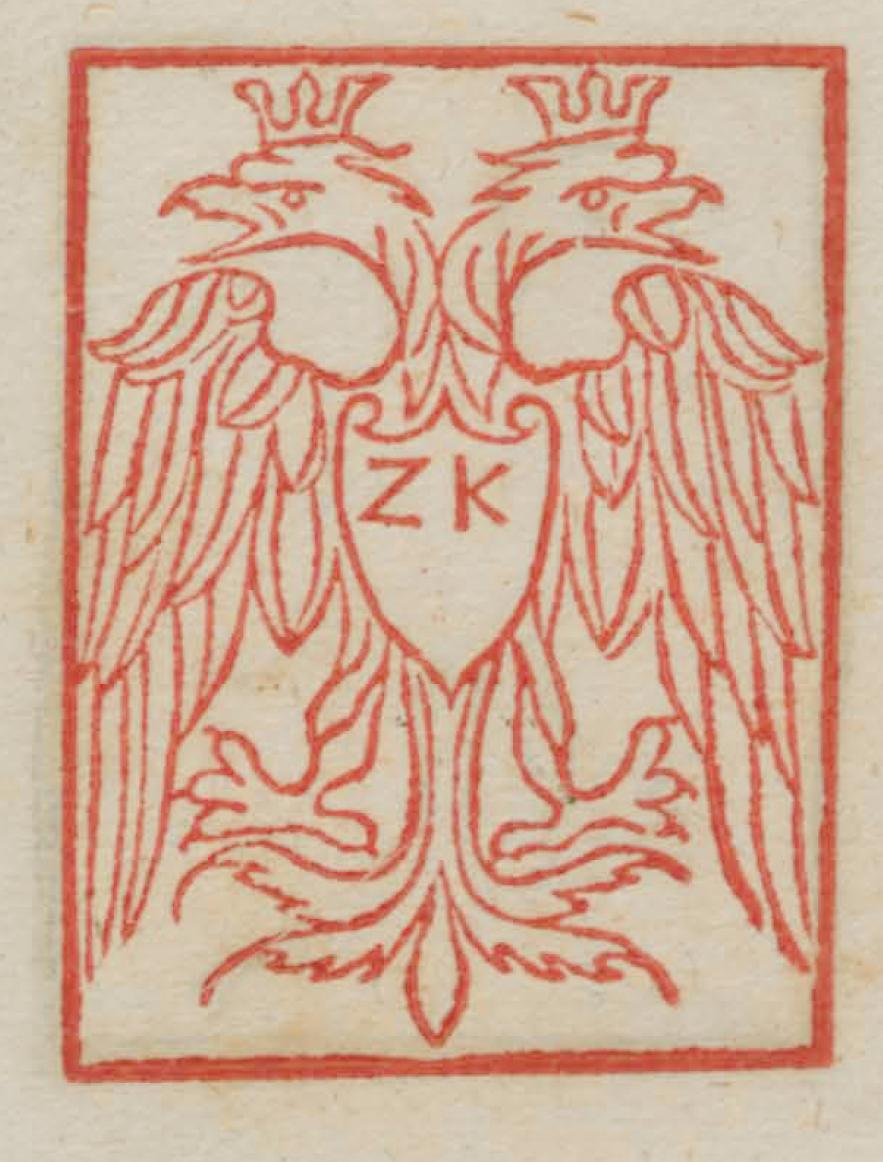
Printer's insignia used by Zacharias Calliergi

Zacharias Calliergi or Zacharias Calliergis (Greek: Ζαχαρίας Καλλιέργης, romanized: Zacharias Kalliergēs) was a Greek Renaissance humanist and scholar.

He was born in Crete, then a Venetian colony, but emigrated to Rome at a young age. In 1499 he helped bring out the Etymologicum Magnum in Venice and in 1515 he set up a printing press where he published exclusively Greek volumes, among them the first Greek book printed in Rome, Pindar's Epinikion ("Victory Odes"). He also instituted the Greek College of the Quirinal (Gymnasium Caballini Montis) where lectures were given, by among others, eminent fellow Cretan scholar Marcus Musurus and Janus Lascaris.

In 1499, he established himself in Venice, along with Nicolaos Vlastos, also a Cretan, the first Greek-owned printing press. Their publishing production wasn’t restricted only to the Greek public but generally to the humanistic public of their era. Also the financial support by Anna Notaras contributed to the 'imperial decoration' of the publications.

The printery was exclusively staffed by Cretans, both in technicians and in individuals who shouldered the literary responsibilities of the publications. The offspring of this Cretan collaboration were four archetypes: the Etymologicum Magnum, one of the most important Byzantine dictionaries, the Ypomnema eis tas dekas kategorias tou Aristotelous, the Ypomnema eis tas pente phonas Porphyriou, tou Ammoniou and the Therapeutica of Galen.

The publications are characterized by Byzantine luster, enriched by the expanded use of red-types, and aesthetic titles, and different sized first letters.

His edition of the Etymologicum Magnum is one of the most important monuments of Byzantine literature. The beauty of this book comes from the tasteful aesthetics of the letters, which characterize the Byzantine, especially the liturgical Byzantine book. The pages are illustrated by xylography, in the top of each chapter.

== Known works ==
- Etymologicum Magnum, extensive Greek etymological dictionary, 1499
- Ypomnema eis tas deka kategorias tou Aristotelous, ("Memorandum to the ten categories of Aristotle"), 1499
- Agapetou diakonou parainetika kephalaia pros Ioustinianon, ("Deacon Agapetos’ exhortative chapters to Justinian"), 1509
- Thoma tou Magistrou, kat’alphabeton Attidos dialektou ekloga, eis oi dokimotatoi orontai ton palaion, kai tines autis parasemeioseis kai diaphorai, 1515
- The victory odes of Pindar, including the editio princeps of the scholia, 1515
- Theokriton, 1516
- Apophthegmata philosophon, syllechthenta ypo Arseniou Monemvasias ("Sayings of philosophers, collected by Arsenios of Monemvasia"), 1515
- Mega kai pany ophelimon lexicon, oper Garinos o Favorinos Kamirs o Nikairias episkopos ek pollon kai diaphoron biblion kata stoicheion synelexanto, 1523

== See also ==
- Greek scholars in the Renaissance
