= Hermann Bonitz =

German philologist and educationist (1814–1888)

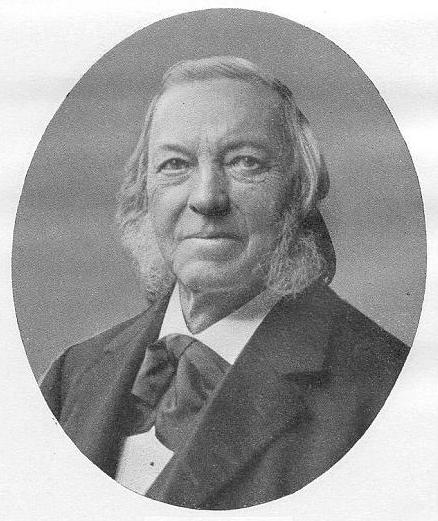
Hermann Bonitz

Hermann Bonitz (29 July 1814 – 25 July 1888), German scholar, was born at Langensalza in Prussian Saxony.

== Biography ==
Having studied at the University of Leipzig under G. Hermann and at Berlin under Böckh and Lachmann, Bonitz became successively teacher at the Blochmann-Institut in Dresden (1836), Oberlehrer at the Friedrich Wilhelm Gymnasium (1838) and the Graues Kloster (1840) in Berlin, professor at the gymnasium at Stettin (Szczecin) (1842), professor at the University of Vienna (1849), member of the Imperial Academy of Sciences (1854), member of the council of education (1864), and director of the Graues-Kloster-Gymnasium (1867). He retired in 1888, and died in that year at Berlin.

He took great interest in higher education, and was chiefly responsible for the system of teaching and examination in use in the high schools of Prussia after 1882. But it is as a commentator on Plato and Aristotle that he is best known outside Germany. He also wrote largely on classical and educational subjects, mainly for the Zeitschrift für die österreichischen Gymnasien.

A full list of his writings is given in the obituary notice by Theodor Gomperz in the Biographisches Jahrbuch fr Altertumskunde (1890).

== Works ==
His most important works in this connection are:

- Disputationes Platonicae Duae (1837); Platonische Studien (3rd edition, 1886).
- Observationes Criticae in Aristotelis Libros Metaphysicos (1842).
- Observationes Criticae in Aristotelis quae feruntur Magna Moralia et Ethica Eudemia (1844).
- Alexandri Aphrodisiensis Commentarius in Libros Metaphysicos Aristotelis (1847).
- Aristotelis Metaphysica (1848–1849).
- Über die Kategorien des A. (1853).
- Aristotelische Studien (1862–1867).
- Index Aristotelicus (1870).

Other works include:

- Über den Ursprung der homerischen Gedichte (5th edition, 1881).
- Beiträge zur Erklärung des Thukydides (1854), des Sophokles (1856–57).
