= Michael Apostolius =

15th century Greek teacher, writer and copyist

Michael Apostolius (Greek: Μιχαὴλ Ἀποστόλιος or Μιχαὴλ Ἀποστόλης; c. 1420 in Constantinople – after 1474 or 1486, possibly in Venetian Crete) or Apostolius Paroemiographus, i.e. Apostolius the proverb-writer, was a Greek teacher, writer and copyist who lived in the fifteenth century.

== Life ==
Apostolius, a student of John Argyropoulos, taught for a short time at the Monastery of St. John of Petra in Constantinople. Taken prisoner by the Turks during the fall of Constantinople in 1453, he was later released and fled to Crete, then a Venetian colony. There he earned a scanty living by teaching and by copying manuscripts for Italian humanists, including his patron, Cardinal Bessarion. He often complained about his poverty: one of his manuscripts, a copy of the Eikones of Philostratus, now in Bologna, bears the inscription: "The king of the poor of this world has written this book for his living."

Apostolius died about 1480, leaving a son, Arsenius Apostolius, who became bishop of Malvasia (Monemvasia) in the Morea.

== Selected works ==
- Παροιμίαι (Paroemiae, Greek for "proverbs"), a collection of proverbs in Greek
  - an edition published in Basel in 1538
  - a fuller edition edited by Daniel Heinsius ("Curante Heinsio") and published in Leiden in 1619
  - a critical edition edited by E. L. von Leutsch and published in Göttingen in 1851
- "Oratio Panegyrica ad Fredericum III." in Marquard Freher's Scriptores Rerum Germanicarum, vol. ii. (Frankfurt, 1624)
- Georgii Gemisthi Plethonis et Mich. Apostolii Orationes funebres duae in quibus de Immortalitate Animae exponitur (Leipzig, 1793)
- a work against the Latin Church and the council of Florence in Étienne Le Moine's Varia Sacra.

== See also ==
- Greek scholars in the Renaissance
