= Balthasar Cordier =

Belgian Jesuit exegete and editor

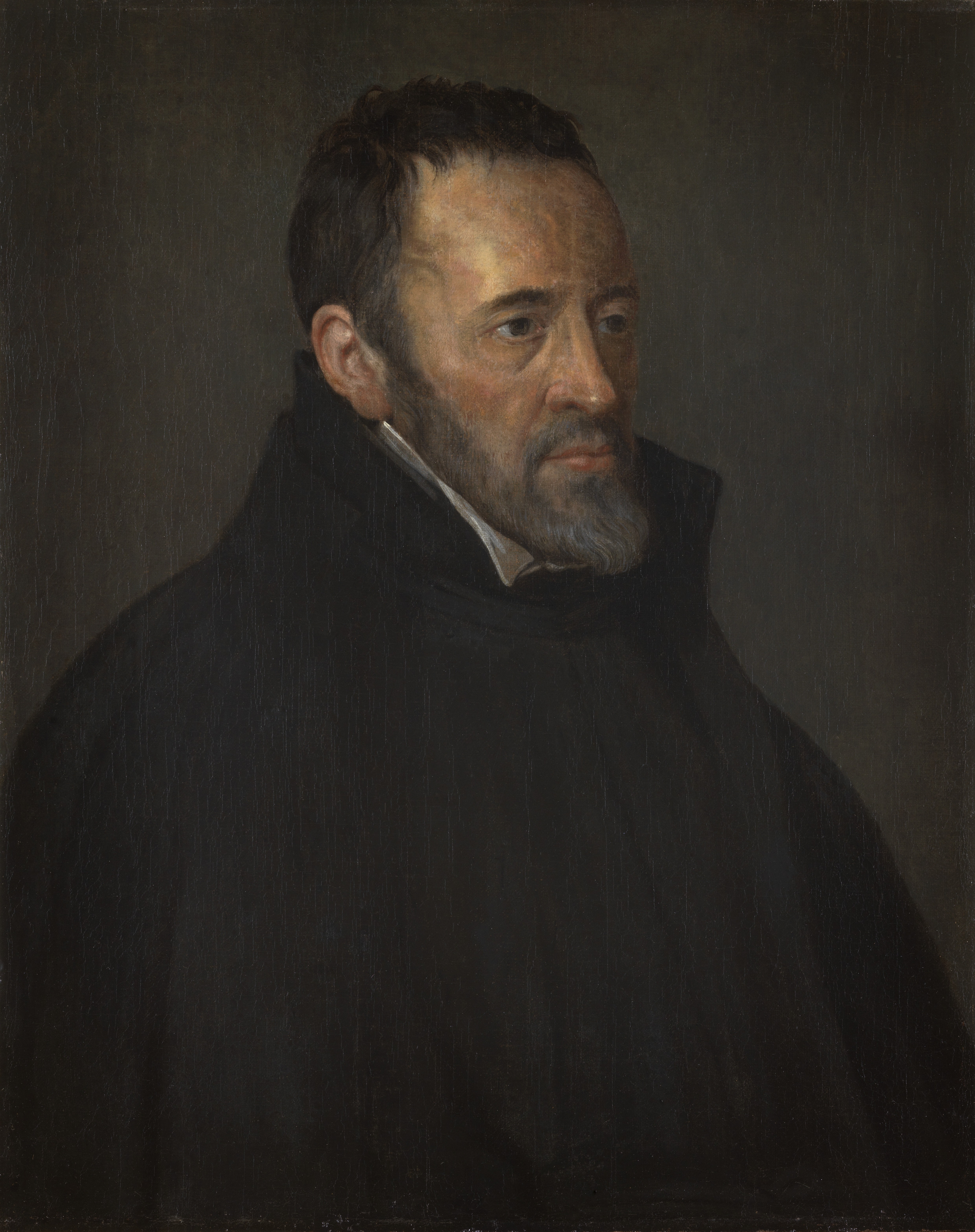
Portrait of Balthasar Corderius, Thomas Willeboirts Bosschaert, collection Museum Plantin-Moretus

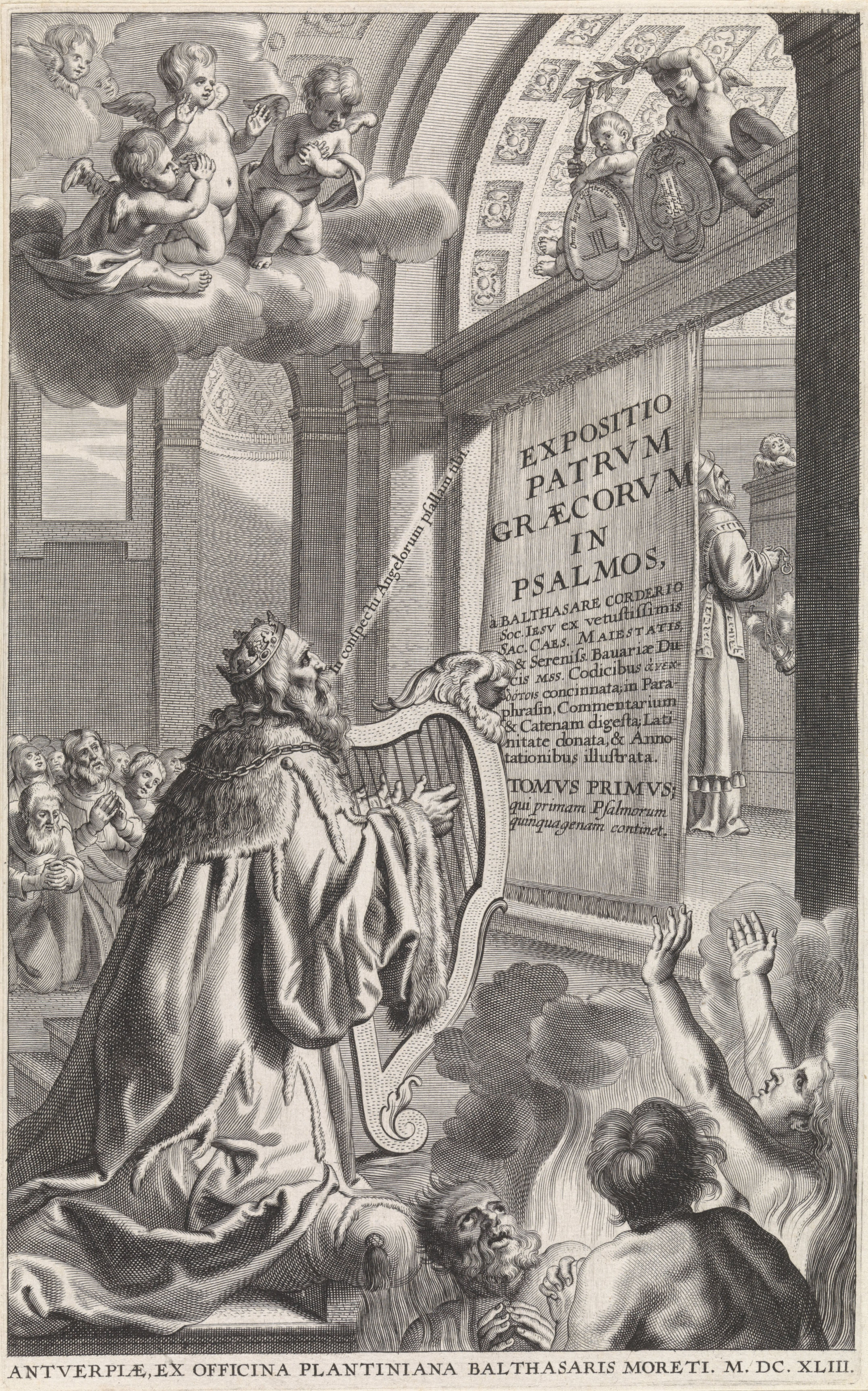
Balthasar Cordier, Expositio Patrum Graecorum in Psalmos, 1643. Antwerpen: Balthasar Moretus, 1643.

Balthasar Cordier (Corderius) (b. at Antwerp, 7 June 1592; d. at Rome, 24 June 1650) was a Belgian Jesuit exegete and editor of patristic works. He entered the Society of Jesus in 1612, and after teaching Greek, moral theology, and Sacred Scripture, devoted himself to translating and editing manuscripts of Greek catenae and other works of the Greek Fathers, for which he searched the libraries of Europe.

== Works ==
He published the following:

- Catena sexaginta quinque Patrum græcorum in S. Lucam (Antwerp, 1628)
- Catena Patrum græcorum in S. Joannem (Antwerp, 1630)
- Joannis Philoponi in cap. I Geneseos ... libri septem (Antwerp, 1630)
- S. Cyrilli apologiæ morales (Vienna, 1630)
- Opera S. Dionysii Areopagitæ cum S. Maximi scholiis (Antwerp, 1634)
- Expositio Patrum græcorum in Psalmos (Antwerp, 1643–46)
- Symbolæ in Matthæum (2 vols., of which, however, only the second is by him; Toulouse, 1646–47)
- S. Dorothei archimandritæ institutiones asceticæ (Antwerp, 1646)
- S. P. N. Cyrilli archiepiscopi Alexandini homiliæ XIX in Jeremiam (Antwerp, 1648)
- Job Illustratus (Antwerp, 1646; reprinted in Migne's Cursus S. Scripturæ. XIII and XIV, and in Campon's edition of Cornelius a Lapide), a commentary on the Book of Job
