= Jacopo Morelli =

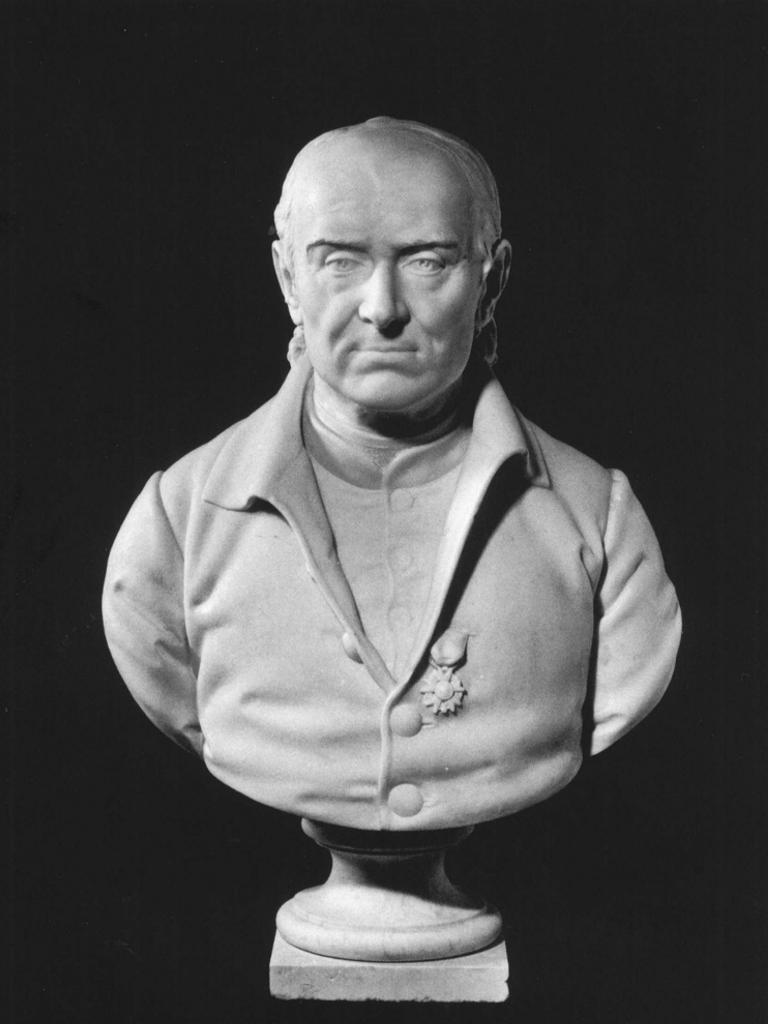
- Born: 15 April 1745; Venice
- Died: 5 May 1819; Venice
- Occupations: Librarian; Minister; writer

Abbe Iacopo Morelli or Jacopo Morelli; Jacobi Morelli; Giacomo Morelli; Abbe Morelli (15 April 1745 – 5 May 1819) was an Italian ecclesiastic, noted for his antiquarian labors, and one of the most distinguished librarians of modern times.

Morelli was born in Venice on 14 April 1745. He was the son of poor parents, who were unable to give him a liberal education. It was against their will that he resolved to enter the Church, although in all other respects he always showed the greatest deference to their wishes. He afterwards supplied the deficiencies of his education by private study, and the knowledge which he thus acquired was more substantial and extensive than that of any of his Italian contemporaries, though it was not till late in life that he became acquainted with the Greek and French languages. His love of independence induced him to refuse several very advantageous offers that were made to him both by the Church and by wealthy collectors of books at Venice, and he continued to live as a simple abbe. He formed, however, an intimate friendship with the patrician Farsetti, of whose rich collection of manuscripts. he published a catalogue, under the title of Bibliotheca Manuscritta del bali T.G. Farsetti (Venice, 1771–80, 2 volumes, 12mo). While this work was in course of publication, he also wrote Dissertazione Storica intorno alla Publica Libreria di S. Marco (Venice, 1774), in which he discussed and solved a great many questions connected with the history of literature. He then prepared a similar work on the history of the library of the academy at Padua, whither he had accompanied his friend Farsetti; but the materials which he collected for that purpose were unfortunately left in the hands of Colle, the historiographer of that institution, through whose carelessness they were lost. In 1776 he published a catalogue of the manuscripts of ancient writers which were in the library of the Narni family and somewhat later a catalogue of the manuscripts of Italian works contained in the same library. These works alone would have sufficed to secure to Morelli an honorable place among the eminent bibliographers of modern times; but he acquired a still greater reputation as librarian of the library of St. Mark — an office which he received in 1778, and which he held until his death on 5 May 1819.

In 1795 he discovered a considerable fragment of the 55th book of Dion Cassius, which he published at Bassano, together with new various readings of other books of the same historian. The work which exhibits his extensive knowledge and his critical acumen in the strongest light is his Bibliotheca Manuscripta Graeca et Latina, of which, however, only one volume was published at Bassano (1802), although he had collected materials for several more volumes. His last production was Epistole septens variae eruditionis (Padua, 1819). After his death there appeared Operette ora insieme con Opuscoli di Antichi Scrittori (Venice, 1820, 3 volumes, 8vo). See Zendrini, Elogio di Morelli (Mil. 1821); reproduced in the Galleria du Letterati ed artisti illustri della provincii Veneziane nel Secolo XVIII (Venice, 1822–24); Bettio, Orazione recifata nelle solenne Esequie nella Chiesa Patriarcale di Venezia (Venice, 1819).
