= Ways and Means (Xenophon) =

Essay by Xenophon

- Author: Xenophon
- Original title: Πόροι ἢ περὶ Προσόδων
- Translator: Henry Dakyns
- Language: Ancient Greek
- Subject: Political economy
- Publication date: 355 BC
- Publication place: Classical Athens
- Media type: manuscript
- Dewey Decimal: 938.06
- LC Class: PN37 .X466
- Original text: Πόροι ἢ περὶ Προσόδων at Greek Wikisource

Ways and Means (Greek: Πόροι ἢ περὶ Προσόδων, Poroi ē peri Prosodōn, "The Public Revenues or Concerning Income", also translated A Pamphlet on Revenues) was written in 355 BC and is believed to be the last work written by Xenophon. This was shortly after Athens's defeat in the Social War and the collapse of the Second Athenian League, and the city was facing financial ruin. Ways and Means is made up of six chapters, addressed to the Council of Five Hundred in response to political statements that expressed that Athens's unfair behavior against other cities is due to its poverty. The essay consists of suggestions to alleviate the economic situation in Athens at this time. Xenophon proposes through Ways and Means that Athens would be able to support itself without relying on the profits of war and empire. There are different receptions of this work, but mainly agreed upon is that this was an attempt to create a new type of imperialism that was supported more by peace and Athens itself instead of oppressive behavior on other cities.

== Synopsis ==
=== Chapter 1 ===
In chapter 1, Xenophon lists the natural qualities of Athens that should allow it to have a sufficient income. Xenophon lists reasons such as the abundance of natural resources like stone and silver in Attica as sources of revenue. Another point was that tamer seasons in the region allowed for higher agricultural capabilities. Xenophon also references that Athens is in a central location in Greece, good for trade by land and sea and isolated from barbarians.

=== Chapter 2 ===
In chapter 2, Xenophon suggests that Athens should increase the population of metics as a means of increasing revenue. Xenophon identifies metics as a prime source of revenue due to their obligation to pay taxes to the city of Athens. He suggests incentivizing the foreigners by decreasing their duties required of them to stay in Athens and building loyalty to the city. Specifically, he brings up alleviating the metics of their duties as infantry for the city to decrease the payment that Athens has to make to them for their service, while keeping their payments and also making the Athenian infantry completely consisting of citizens. Other incentives that Xenophon suggests are privileges such as granting the metics the ability to serve in the cavalry and own land within the walls of Athens.

=== Chapter 3 ===
In chapter 3, Xenophon brings up the reasons why Athens would be a great commercial center and therefore increase revenue through exports, sales, rents and customs. He states that trading through Athens would be the best and most secure for the traders especially, because Athens's currency is already distributed among different regions in Greece. Similar to the ideas brought up in the previous chapter, Xenophon suggests incentivizing trading with Athens by making markets more fair in managing disputes and to reserve front row seats in theaters for merchants. He states that changes are also relatively low cost to the financial gain that the city will see. Other ideas to increase trade were such as creating a fleet of public trading ships owned by the state to loan out to merchants.

=== Chapter 4 ===
In chapter 4, Xenophon touches on the silver mines and the slaves that worked there. He believed that with proper operation, the revenue that silver will bring to Athens will increase immensely. Xenophon reasons that an increase in the workforce in the silver mining industry will bring large amounts of wealth, where increasing work power in agriculture will simply result in a plateau of work efficiency. Therefore, he states that Athens should open up their mining industry to foreigners as well as citizens. He also reasons that as there is an endless demand for silver, as consumers would buy more silver as long as they can afford to, increasing revenue. He also suggests the public ownership of slaves, and to gain revenue by loaning them out.

=== Chapter 5 ===
In chapter 5, Xenophon insinuates the importance of peace to obtain the full economic advantages of the state. He suggests instating a board of peace, which would increase the state's attractiveness to guests from other states. Xenophon argues that Athens in a peace is the most attractive location to all types of visitors and therefore should not attempt to control other states by force. Xenophon supposes that Athens would gain the support of Greece if they wanted to act as an enforcer of peace. He also states that he does not know clearly whether peace is more profitable than war, but that from past experiences, peace has seen more money sent to the treasury where war saw more money leave the treasury.

=== Chapter 6 ===
In chapter 6, Xenophon concludes his essay by reminding the council about the wonders that the changes he proposed would bring to Athens. He entices the council about the magnificent festivals that would be held with increased revenue and increased security and quality of life for the citizens. He also warns the council, however, that they should send for Delphi to ask the gods whether this is the correct path for Athens to continue on. He ends the essay, saying that with the blessings of the gods, Athens action would impact positively, making it wealthy once again.
