= Aphthonius of Antioch =

Fourth century Greek sophist and rhetorician

Aphthonius of Antioch (Greek: Ἀφθόνιος Ἀντιοχεὺς ὁ Σύρος; fl. c. 315) was a Greek sophist and rhetorician who lived in the second half of the 4th century CE.

== Life ==
No information about his personal life is available except for his friendship with the sophist Libanius and a certain Eutropius, who may have been the author of a Roman history epitome.

Aphthonius is known for his work Progymnasmata, a textbook on rhetoric and its elements, including exercises for students before they entered formal rhetorical schools. This work served as an introduction to the techne of Hermogenes of Tarsus. Aphthonius's writing style is characterized as pure and simple, and ancient critics praised his atticism. The Progymnasmata remained popular as late as the 17th century, particularly in Germany. A collection of 40 fables written in the style of Aesop is also attributed to Aphthonius.

Aphthonius may have visited the Serapeum of Alexandria around 315 CE, according to Rowe and Rees.
