= Vittore Trincavelli =

Venetian physician and scholar (1496–1568)

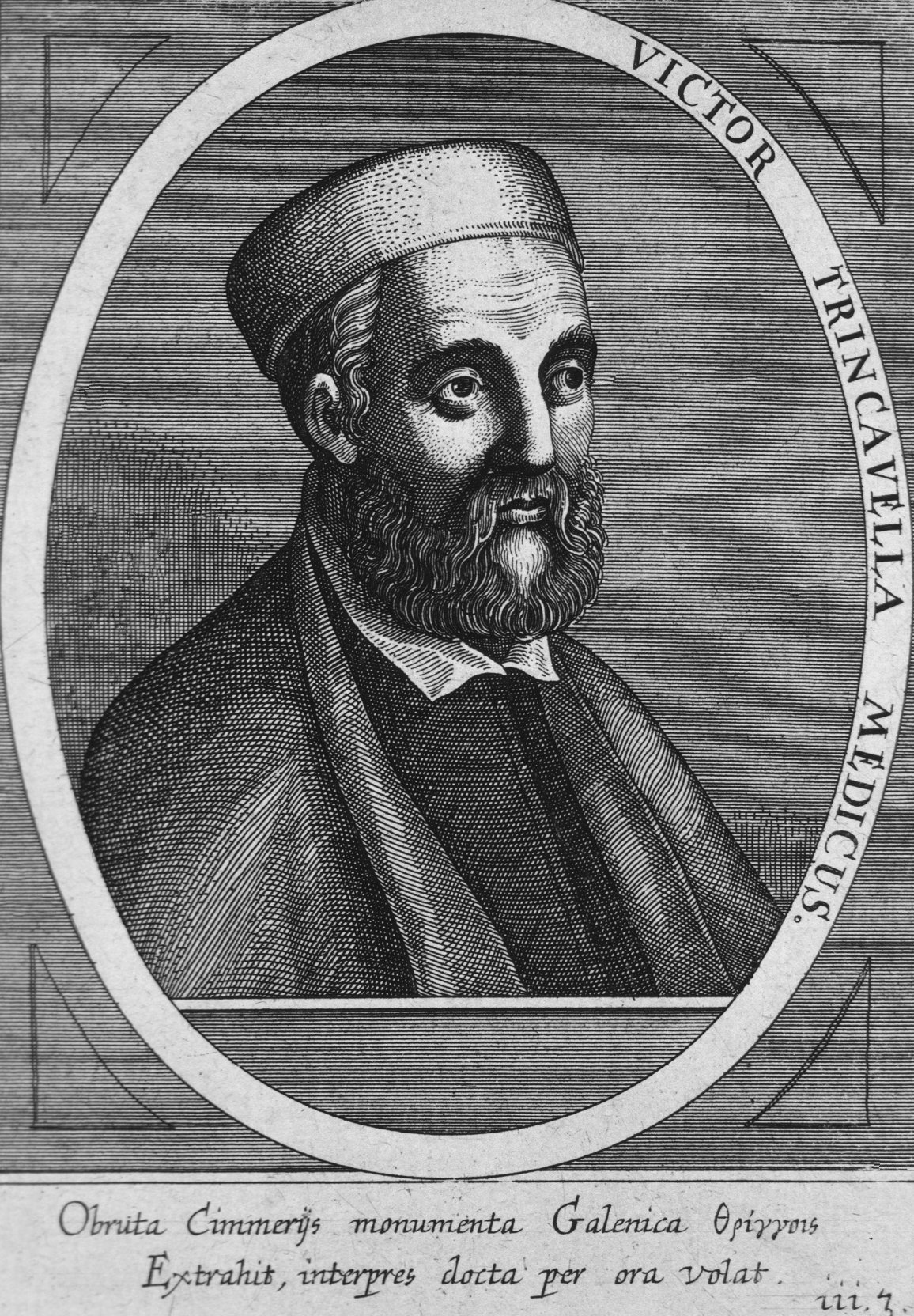
- Born: 1496; Venice, Republic of Venice
- Died: 1568 (aged 71–72); Venice, Republic of Venice
- Education: University of Padua; University of Bologna
- Scientific career
- Fields: Medicine
- Institutions: University of Padua
- Academic advisors: Pietro Pomponazzi
- Doctoral students: Bassiano Landi
- Other notable students: Theodor Zwinger

Vittore Trincavelli (also Vettore Trincavelli; 1496–1568) was an Italian physician, who is most famous as the editor of some of the first editions of the Greek classics.

== Biography ==
Trincavelli was born and died at Venice. He began his medical studies at the University of Padua, and went afterwards to the University of Bologna, where he became so distinguished for his knowledge of the Ancient Greek, that the professors of the university would often consult him on difficult passages, and he was honoured by the name of the "Greek scholar." After remaining seven years at Bologna, he returned to Padua to earn his medical doctorate and then to the University of Venice, where he was appointed successor to Sebastian Fuscareni in the chair of philosophy.

His time was divided between his lectures, his private studies, and his practice as a physician. He gained acclaim for serving the population of the island of Murano, when they were afflicted with an epidemic malady. The latter was so extensive as to bring him annually about three thousand crowns of gold. In 1551 he was appointed successor to Johannes Baptista Montanus, in the medical professorship at Padua, and exchanged the profits of his practice for a salary of 950 crowns, which the senate afterwards increased to 1600. While being a professor there, he was the first who lectured on Hippocrates in the original language. Finding the infirmities of age approach, he resigned his office, and returned to Venice, where he died in 1568, aged 71.

== Works ==
His medical writings, most of which had been published separately, were printed together in 2 volumes at Leyden, in 1586 and 1592, and at Venice in 1599. He was editor of the following first editions:

- Themistii Orationes, 1534.
- Joannes Grammaticus Philoponus, 1534.
- Epicteti Enchiridion, 1535.
- Hesiod, 1536. The scholia and text of this edition formed the basis of many subsequent editions.

Trincavelli also published editions of Stobaeus and other Greek writers.
