= Sigismund Gelenius =

Bohemian humanist and scholar (1497–1554)

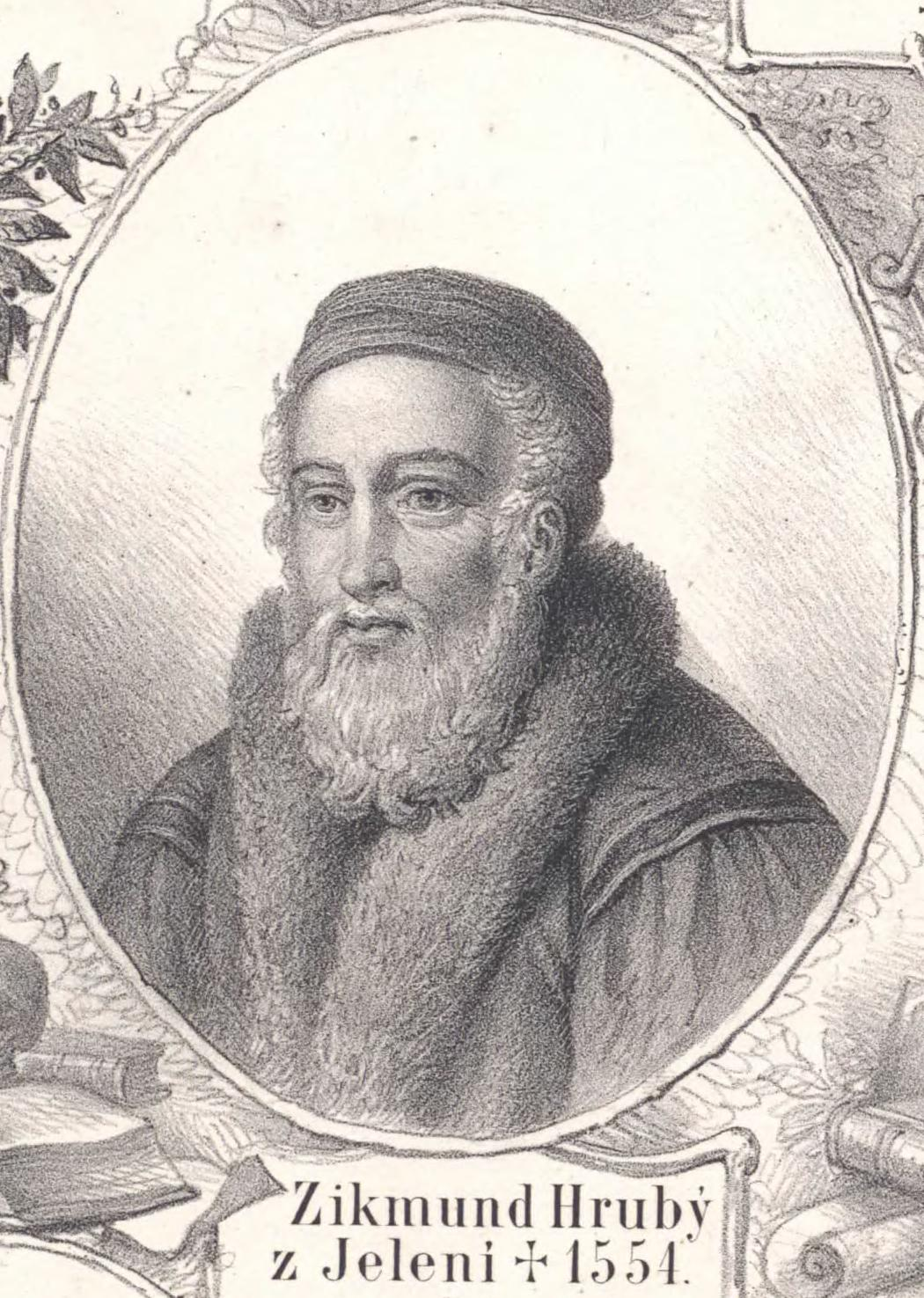
Sigismund Gelenius 1554 portrait

Sigismund Gelenius (also known as Sigismund Gelen or Sigmund Gelen, Czech: Zikmund Hrubý z Jelení; 1497–1554), was a Bohemian noble and scholar.

== Life ==
He was born in Prague. He was a scholar of Greek and humanist, trained by the Cretan scholar Marcus Musurus. He initially studied in Prague and afterwards, on his father's suggestion, in Italy. After his studies he travelled in Italy, Germany and France. On his return he became dissatisfied with conditions at the Czech University and in 1523 or 1524 he moved to Basel, where he found a position as editor in the printing-house of Johann Froben, one of the most renowned of its day. He worked for some time with Erasmus and lived in his household.

== Work ==
Gelenius translated Erasmus's Moriae, as well as works by Petrarch and Cicero into Czech. For Froben he edited Ammianus Marcellinus and the Periplus of the Erythraean Sea (1533), the Historia Miscella (1535, published under the title Eutropii insigne volumen), the Naturalis Historia of Pliny the Elder (1539, revised 1545) and the works of Tertullian (1539, collaborating with Beatus Rhenanus), along with many other works. All those listed were published after Froben's death by the partnership of his son Hieronymus and son-in-law Nikolaus Episcopius. The edition of the Periplus was full of errors which were not corrected until the 10th century Heidelberg manuscript was returned to Heidelberg in 1816.
