= Spanish Golden Age =

Period of flourishing in arts and literature in Spain (1492–1681)

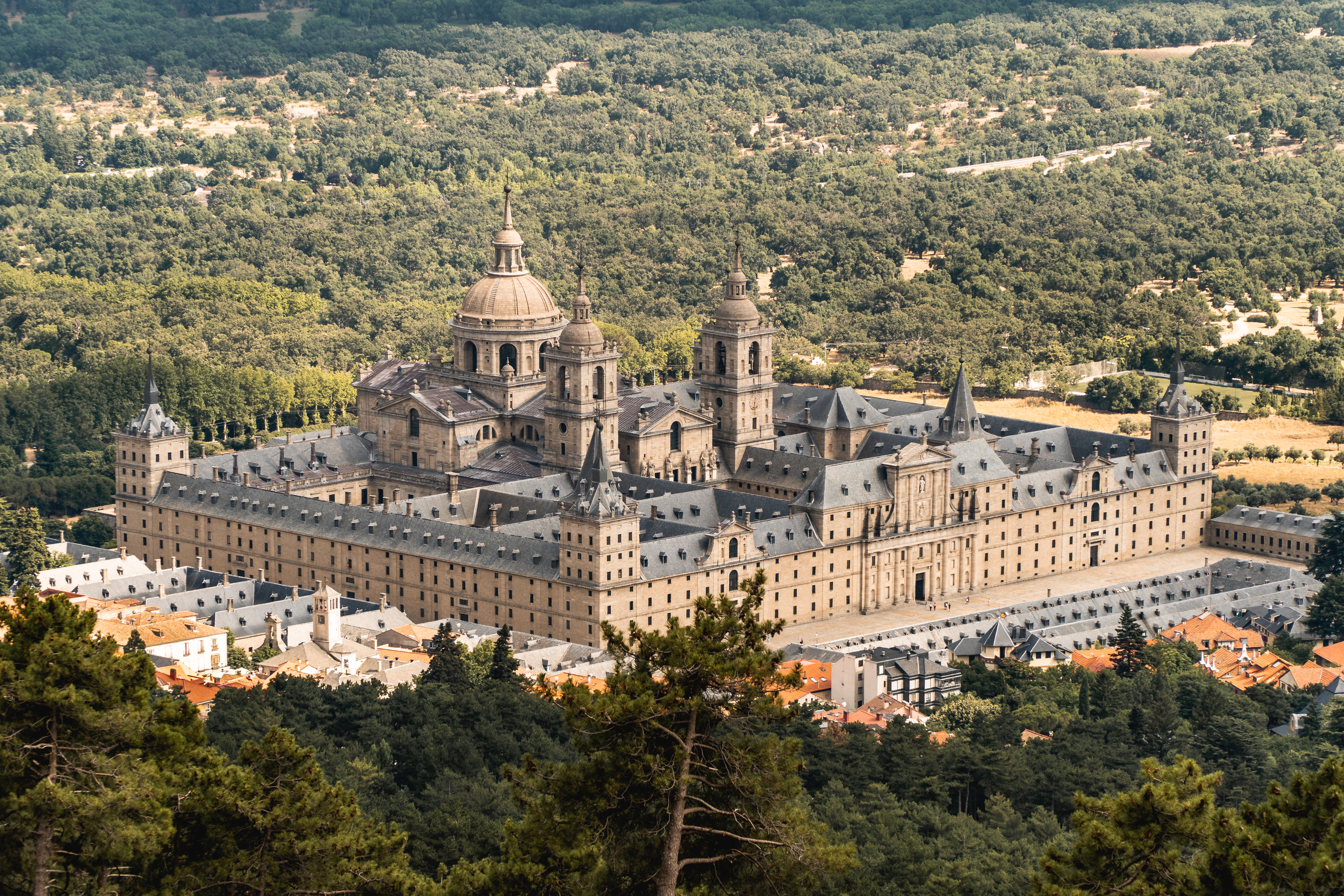
Royal Site of San Lorenzo de El Escorial. Built between 1563 and 1584 by order of King Philip II, it is the largest Renaissance building in the world.

The Spanish Golden Age (Spanish: Siglo de Oro [ˈsiɣlo ðe ˈoɾo] 'Golden Century') was a period of intense artistic, literary, and intellectual flourishing in Spain that broadly coincided with the political rise of the Spanish monarchy under the Catholic Monarchs of Spain and the Spanish Habsburgs. The period is generally associated with the reigns of Isabella I, Ferdinand II, Charles V, Philip II, Philip III, and Philip IV, during which Spain became a leading political and military power.

The Golden Age is conventionally considered to have begun in 1492, a year often treated as a turning point in Spanish history because it saw the completion of the Reconquista with the conquest of Granada, the first voyage of Christopher Columbus to the Americas, the establishment of the Inquisition, and the publication of Antonio de Nebrija's Grammar of the Castilian Language. Its political phase is often regarded as having ended in 1659 with the Treaty of the Pyrenees, although the period is commonly understood to have continued in cultural terms until 1681, the year of Pedro Calderón de la Barca's death.

The era was characterized by extensive royal, aristocratic, and ecclesiastical patronage, which supported literature, painting, architecture, music, and theatre. Major artistic and cultural projects, including El Escorial, contributed to the formation of a distinctive Spanish court and religious culture. The period encompassed the Plateresque and Renaissance styles and extended into the early Spanish Baroque. It produced many of the best-known figures in Spanish cultural history, including famous writers and poets like Miguel de Cervantes, Lope de Vega, Luis de Góngora and Francisco de Quevedo, great painters like Diego Velázquez, El Greco, Bartolomé Esteban Murillo, Francisco de Zurbarán, and composers such as Tomás Luis de Victoria and Francisco Guerrero.

== Overview ==
The realms of Philip II of Spain

The Spanish Golden Age began after the union of King Ferdinand II of Aragon and Queen Isabella I of Castile, which brought stability following years of conflict. After the conquest of Al-Andalus (Muslim Spain) and the expulsion of the Jews, the various Christian kingdoms under the Catholic Monarchs of Spain unified into a single state. This era saw a flourishing of literature and the arts in Spain. The most significant patron of Spanish art and culture during this time was King Philip II (1556–1598).

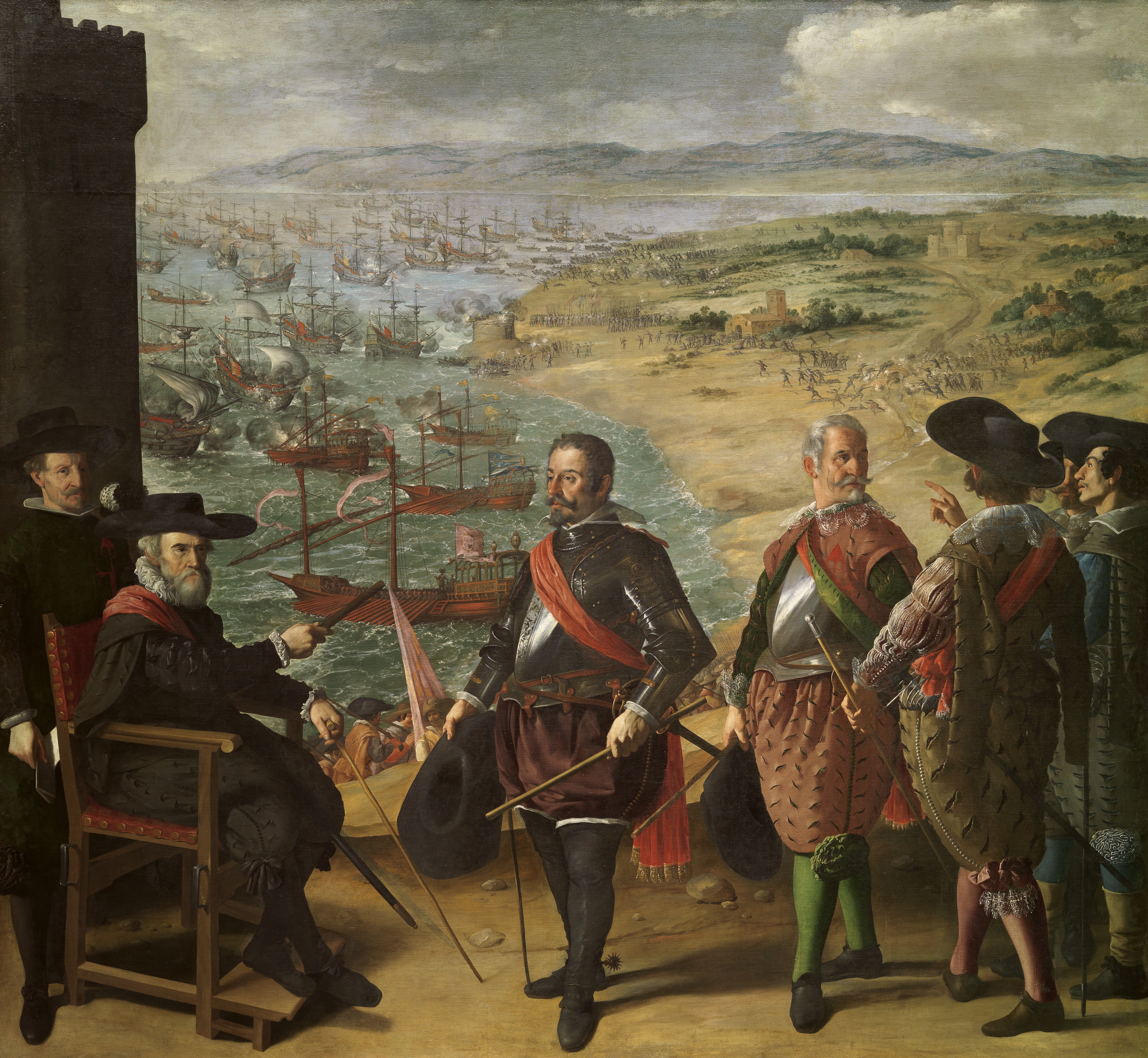
The Defence of Cádiz Against the English oil on canvas by Francisco de Zurbarán

During this period, Philip II's royal palace, El Escorial, known in its own time as the eighth wonder of the world, attracted some of Europe's greatest architects and painters, including El Greco. These artists introduced foreign styles to Spanish art, contributing to the development of a uniquely Spanish style of painting.

The start of the Golden Age can be placed in 1492, with the end of the Reconquista, the voyages of Christopher Columbus to the New World, the expulsion of Jews from Spain, and the publication of Antonio de Nebrija's Grammar of the Castilian Language. Amongst scholars of the period, it is generally accepted that it came to an end around the time of the Treaty of the Pyrenees (1659), that concluded the Franco-Spanish War of 1635 to 1659. Others, however, extend the Golden Age up to 1681 with the death of Pedro Calderón de la Barca, the last great writer of the age. Generally, it is divided into a Plateresque/Renaissance period and the early part of the Spanish Baroque period.

The Spanish Golden Age spans the work of Miguel de Cervantes, the author of Don Quixote de la Mancha; and of Lope de Vega, Spain's most prolific playwright, who wrote around 1,000 plays during his lifetime, of which over 400 survive to the present day. Lope de Vega, Luis de Gongora, Quevedo, Pedro Calderón de la Barca, and many other prominent poets attended the famous Medrano Academy (also known as the Poetic Academy of Madrid) established by Sebastián Francisco de Medrano in 1616.

Diego Velázquez, regarded as one of the most influential painters of European history and a greatly respected artist in his own time, was patronized by King Philip IV and his chief minister, the Count-Duke of Olivares.

What is widely acknowledged as some of Spain's greatest music was written during this period. Composers such as Tomás Luis de Victoria, Cristóbal de Morales, Francisco Guerrero, Luis de Milán and Alonso Lobo helped to shape Renaissance music and the styles of counterpoint and polychoral music. Their influence lasted long into the Baroque period, resulting in a revolution of music.

== Painting ==
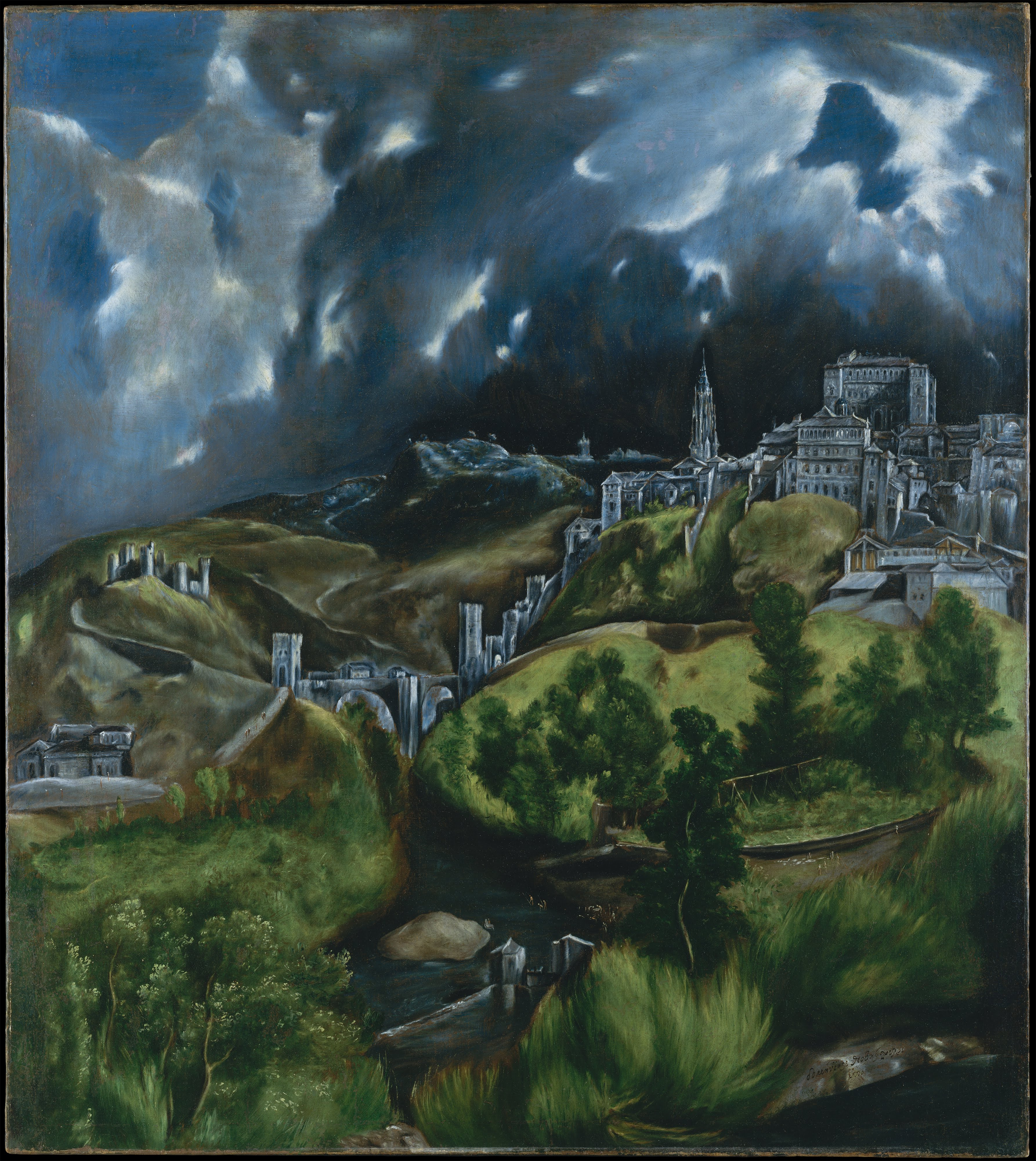
Toledo by El Greco

During the Italian Renaissance, few great artists from Italy visited Spain, but the Italian holdings and relationships established by Ferdinand of Aragon, Queen Isabella's husband and, later, Spain's sole monarch, prompted a steady flow of intellectuals across the Mediterranean between Valencia, Seville, and Florence. Luis de Morales, one of the leading exponents of Spanish Mannerist painting, retained a distinctly Spanish style in his work, reminiscent of medieval art. Spanish art, particularly Morales's, was notable for its mysticism and religious themes, which were encouraged by the Counter-Reformation and by the patronage of Spain's Catholic monarchs and aristocracy. Spanish rule of Naples was important for making connections between Italian and Spanish art, with many Spanish administrators bringing Italian works back to Spain.

=== El Greco ===
Known for his unique expressionistic style, which elicited both puzzlement and admiration, El Greco ("the Greek") was originally from the island of Crete. He was not Spanish but Greek by birth. El Greco studied the great Italian masters of his time—Titian, Tintoretto, and Michelangelo—during his stay in Italy from 1568 to 1577. According to legend, El Greco once claimed he would paint a mural as good as one of Michelangelo's if one of the Italian artist's murals was demolished first. After falling out of favor in Italy, he found a new home in Toledo, central Spain. During this period, Spain was an ideal environment for the Venetian-trained painter, with art flourishing throughout the empire and Toledo being a great place to receive commissions. His paintings of the city became models for a new European tradition in landscapes and influenced the work of later Dutch masters. In his lifetime, El Greco was influential in creating a style based on impressions and emotion, characterized by elongated fingers and vibrant color and brushwork. His works uniquely featured faces that captured expressions of somber attitudes and withdrawal while still having his subjects bear witness to the terrestrial world.

=== Diego Velázquez ===
Las Meninas (1656, English: The Maids of Honour) by Diego Velázquez

Diego Velázquez was born on June 6, 1599, in Seville, to parents of minor nobility and was the eldest of six children. Widely regarded as one of Spain's most important and influential artists, he became a court painter for King Philip IV and gained increasing demand across Europe for his portraits of statesmen, aristocrats, and clergymen. His portraits of the King, his chief minister the Count-Duke of Olivares, and the Pope showcased his belief in artistic realism and a style comparable to many of the Dutch masters. Following the Thirty Years' War, Velázquez met the Marqués de Spinola and painted his famous Surrender of Breda (1635), celebrating Spinola's victory at Breda in 1625. Spinola was impressed by Velázquez's ability to convey emotion through realism in both his portraits and landscapes, the latter of which became a lasting influence on Western painting. Velázquez's friendship with Bartolomé Esteban Murillo, a leading Spanish painter of the next generation, ensured the enduring influence of his artistic approach.

Velázquez's most famous painting is the celebrated Las Meninas (1656, Prado Museum in Madrid) in which the artist includes himself as one of the subjects.

=== Francisco de Zurbarán ===
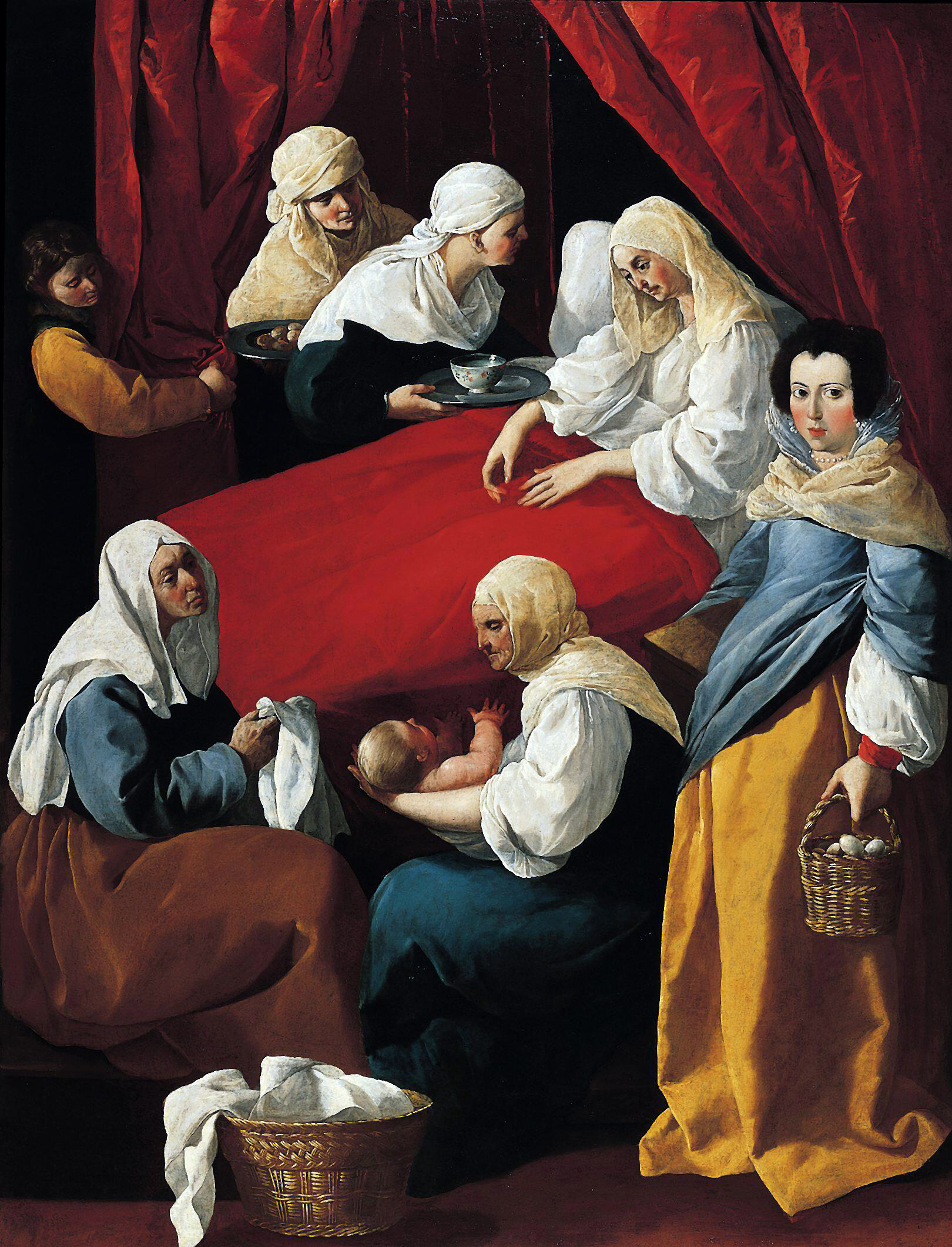
The Birth of the Virgin by Francisco de Zurbarán

The religious element in Spanish art gained prominence in many circles during the Counter-Reformation. The austere, ascetic, and severe works of Francisco de Zurbarán exemplified this trend in Spanish art, alongside the compositions of Tomás Luis de Victoria. Philip IV actively patronized artists whose views aligned with his perspectives on the Counter-Reformation and religion. The mysticism in Zurbarán's work, influenced by Saint Theresa of Avila, became a defining characteristic of Spanish art in subsequent generations. Influenced by Michelangelo da Caravaggio and the Italian masters, Zurbarán dedicated himself to an artistic expression of religion and faith. His paintings of St. Francis of Assisi, the Immaculate Conception, and the Crucifixion of Christ reflected a significant aspect of seventeenth-century Spanish culture, set against the backdrop of religious conflict across Europe. Zurbarán diverged from Velázquez's sharp realist interpretation of art and, to some extent, drew inspiration from the emotive content of El Greco and earlier Mannerist painters. Nevertheless, Zurbarán respected and maintained the lighting and physical nuance characteristic of Velázquez's style.

It is unknown whether Zurbarán had the opportunity to study Caravaggio's paintings; nonetheless, he adopted Caravaggio's realistic use of chiaroscuro. The painter who may have had the greatest influence on his characteristically severe compositions was Juan Sánchez Cotán. Additionally, polychrome sculpture—which had reached a high level of sophistication in Seville by the time of Zurbarán's apprenticeship and surpassed that of the local painters—served as another important stylistic model for the young artist. The work of Juan Martínez Montañés is particularly close to Zurbarán's in spirit.

Zurbarán painted directly from nature and frequently utilized the lay figure in his study of draperies, in which he was particularly skilled. He had a notable talent for depicting white draperies, leading to numerous representations of the white-robed Carthusians in his works. Zurbarán is said to have adhered to these meticulous methods throughout his career, which was successful and spent entirely in Spain. His subjects were predominantly austere and ascetic religious scenes, often depicting the spirit subduing the flesh. These compositions were frequently simplified to a single figure. His style is more reserved and subdued than Caravaggio's, with a color tone that is often bluish. Exceptional effects are achieved through precisely finished foregrounds, primarily utilizing light and shade.

=== Bartolomé Esteban Murillo ===
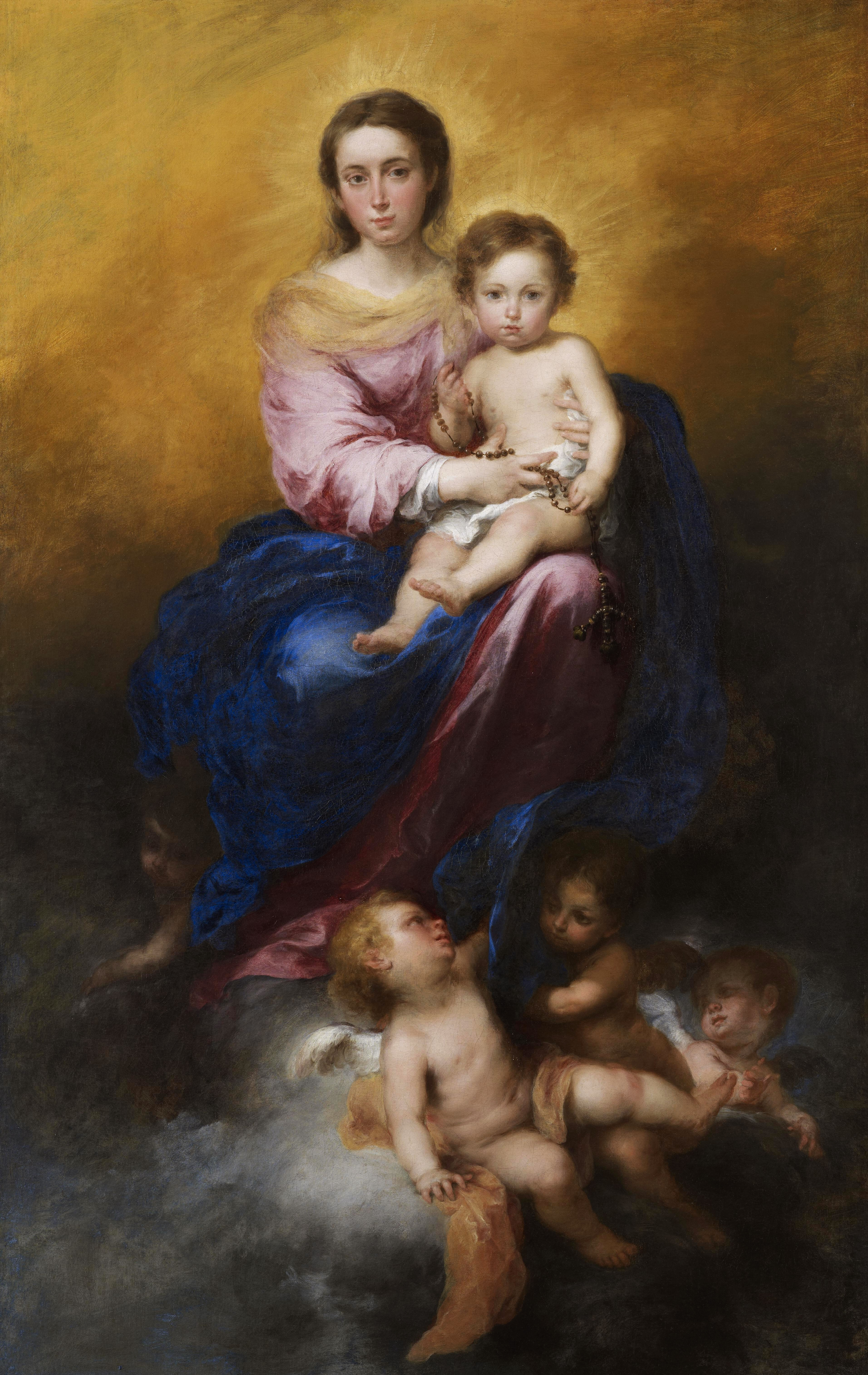
The Virgin of the Rosary (1675–80) by Bartolomé Esteban Murillo

Bartolomé Esteban Murillo began his art studies under Juan del Castillo in Seville. The city's great commercial importance at the time ensured that he was also subject to influences from other regions, which enabled him to become familiar with Flemish painting. His first works were influenced by Zurbarán, Jusepe de Ribera and Alonso Cano, with whom he shared a strongly realist approach. As his painting developed, however, his more important works evolved into a polished style that suited the bourgeois and aristocratic tastes of the time, especially his Roman Catholic religious works.

In 1642, at the age of 26, he moved to Madrid. While there, it is highly likely that he became familiar with the work of Velázquez and that he viewed the work of Venetian and Flemish masters in the royal collections; the influence of both can be seen in the rich colors and softly modeled forms of his later work. Murillo returned to Seville in 1645, where in the same year he painted 13 canvases for the monastery of St. Francisco el Grande. This proved a boost to his reputation. Following the completion of a pair of pictures for the Seville Cathedral, he began to specialize in the themes that brought him his greatest successes: Mary and the Child Jesus, and the Immaculate Conception.

After another period in Madrid from 1658 to 1660, he returned to Seville. There, he was one of the founders of the Academia de Bellas Artes (Academy of Fine Arts), sharing its direction in 1660 with the architect Francisco Herrera the Younger. This was his period of greatest activity, during which he received numerous important commissions, among them the altarpieces for the Augustinian monastery and the paintings for Santa María la Blanca (completed in 1665). He died in 1682.

=== Other significant painters ===
- Luis de Morales
- José de Ribera
- Juan Sánchez Cotán
- Juan van der Hamen
- Francisco Ribalta
- Juan de Valdés Leal
- Juan Carreño de Miranda
- Claudio Coello

== Sculpture ==
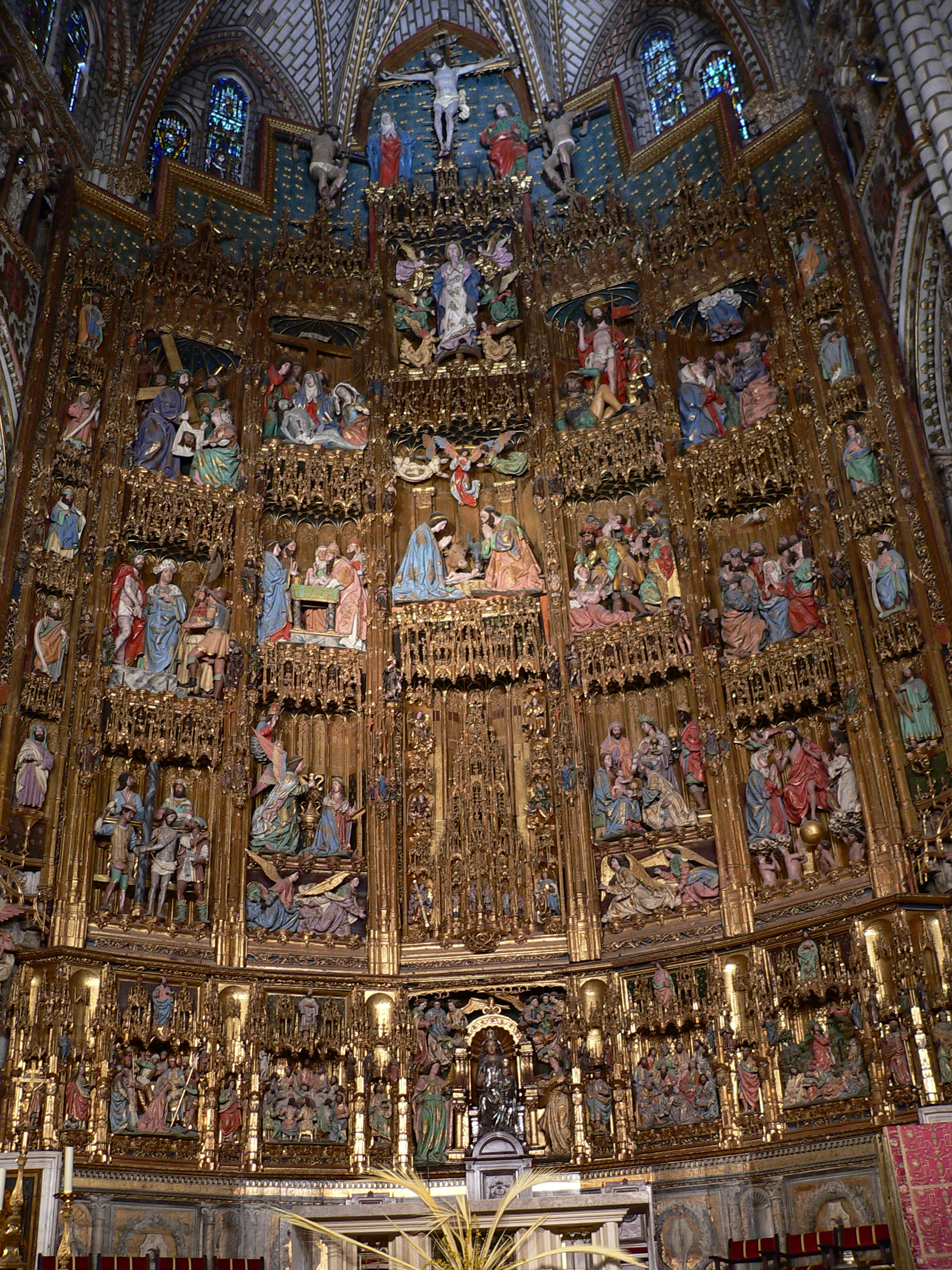
Main altarpiece of the Toledo Cathedral by Felipe Bigarny

=== Sculptors of the Renaissance ===
- Alonso Berruguete
- Felipe Bigarny
- Damià Forment
- Juan de Juni
- Bartolomé Ordóñez
- Diego de Siloé

=== Sculptors of the Early Baroque period ===
- Alonso Cano
- Gregorio Fernández
- Juan Martínez Montañés
- Pedro de Mena
- Juan de Mesa

== Architecture ==
=== Palace of Charles V ===
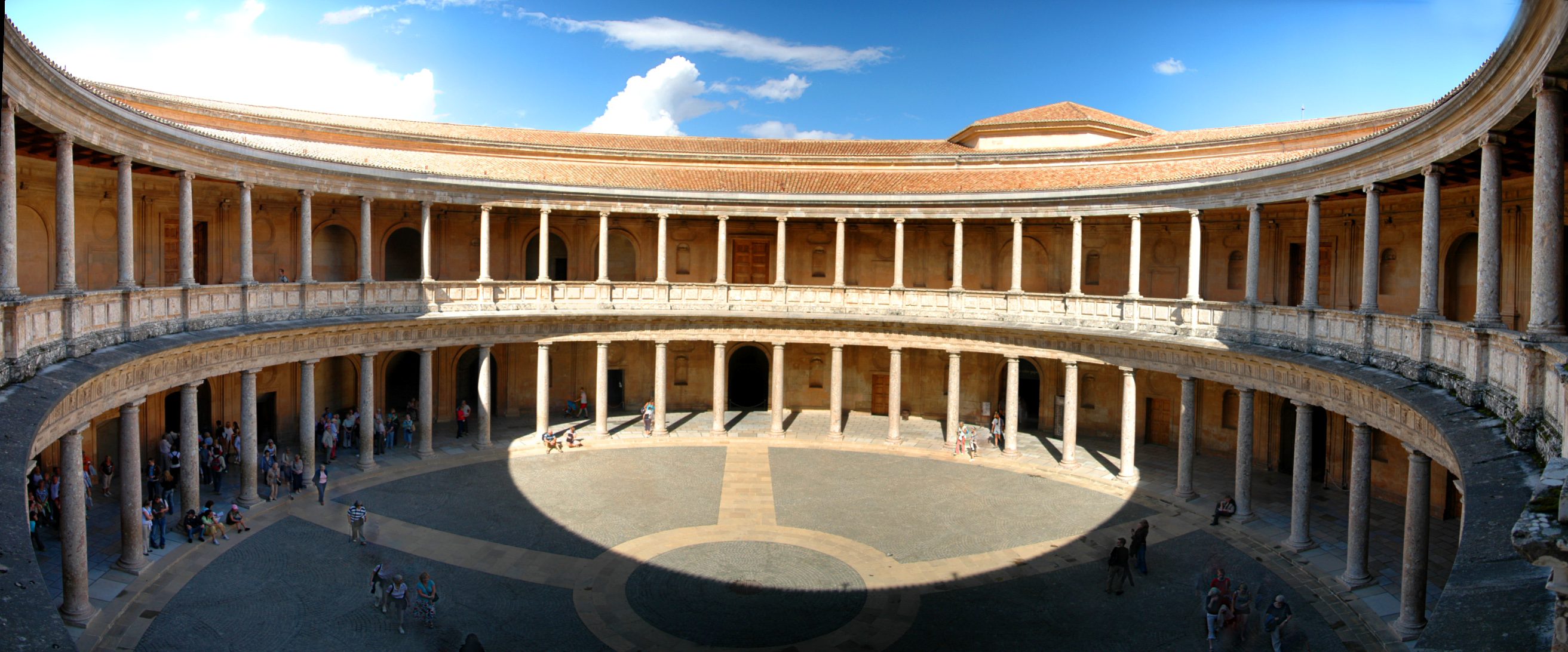
Panoramic view of the lower level patio of the Palace

The Palace of Charles V is a Renaissance construction located on the top of the hill of the Assabica, inside the Nasrid fortification of the Alhambra. It was commanded by Charles V, Holy Roman Emperor, who wished to establish his residence close to the Alhambra palaces. Although the Catholic Monarchs had already altered some rooms of the Alhambra after the conquest of the city in 1492, Charles V intended to construct a permanent residence befitting an emperor. The project was given to Pedro Machuca, an architect whose biography and influences are poorly understood. Even if accounts that place Machuca in the atelier of Michelangelo are accepted, at the time of the construction of the palace in 1527 the latter had yet to design the majority of his architectural works. At the time, Spanish architecture was immersed in the Plateresque style, still with traces of Gothic origin. Machuca built a palace corresponding stylistically to Mannerism, a mode still in its infancy in Italy.

=== El Escorial ===
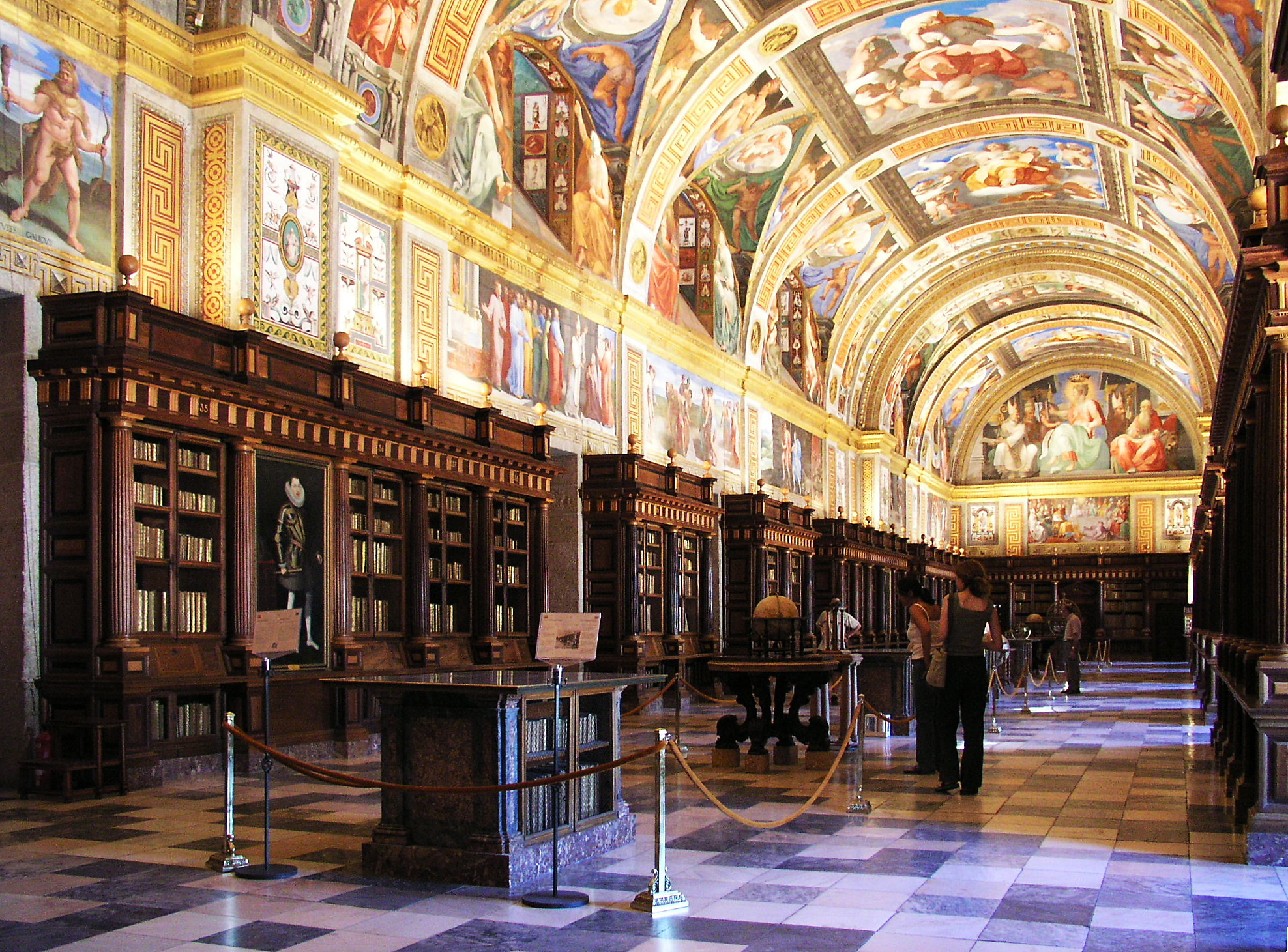
The library of El Escorial

El Escorial is the historical residence of the king of Spain. It is one of the Spanish royal sites and functions as a monastery, royal palace, museum, and school. It is located about 45 kilometres (28 mi) northwest of the Spanish capital, Madrid, in the town of San Lorenzo de El Escorial. El Escorial comprises two architectural complexes of great historical and cultural significance: El Real Monasterio de El Escorial itself and La Granjilla de La Fresneda, a royal hunting lodge and monastic retreat about five kilometers away. These sites have a dual nature; that is to say, during the sixteenth and seventeenth centuries, they were places in which the temporal power of the Spanish monarchy and the ecclesiastical predominance of the Roman Catholic religion in Spain found a common architectural manifestation. El Escorial was at once, a monastery and a Spanish royal palace. Originally a property of the Hieronymite monks, it is now a monastery of the Order of Saint Augustine.

Philip II of Spain, reacting to the Protestant Reformation sweeping through Europe during the sixteenth century, devoted much of his lengthy reign (1556–1598) and much of his seemingly inexhaustible supply of New World silver to stemming the Protestant tide sweeping through Europe while simultaneously fighting the Islamic Ottoman Empire. His protracted efforts were, in the long run, partly successful. However, the same counter-reformational impulse had a much more benign expression thirty years earlier, in Philip's decision to build the complex at El Escorial.

Philip engaged the Spanish architect, Juan Bautista de Toledo, to be his collaborator in the design of El Escorial. Juan Bautista had spent the greater part of his career in Rome, where he had worked on the basilica of St. Peter's, and in Naples, where he had served the king's viceroy, whose recommendation brought him to the king's attention. Philip appointed him architect-royal in 1559, and together they designed El Escorial as a monument to Spain's role as a center of the Christian world.

=== Plaza Mayor in Madrid ===
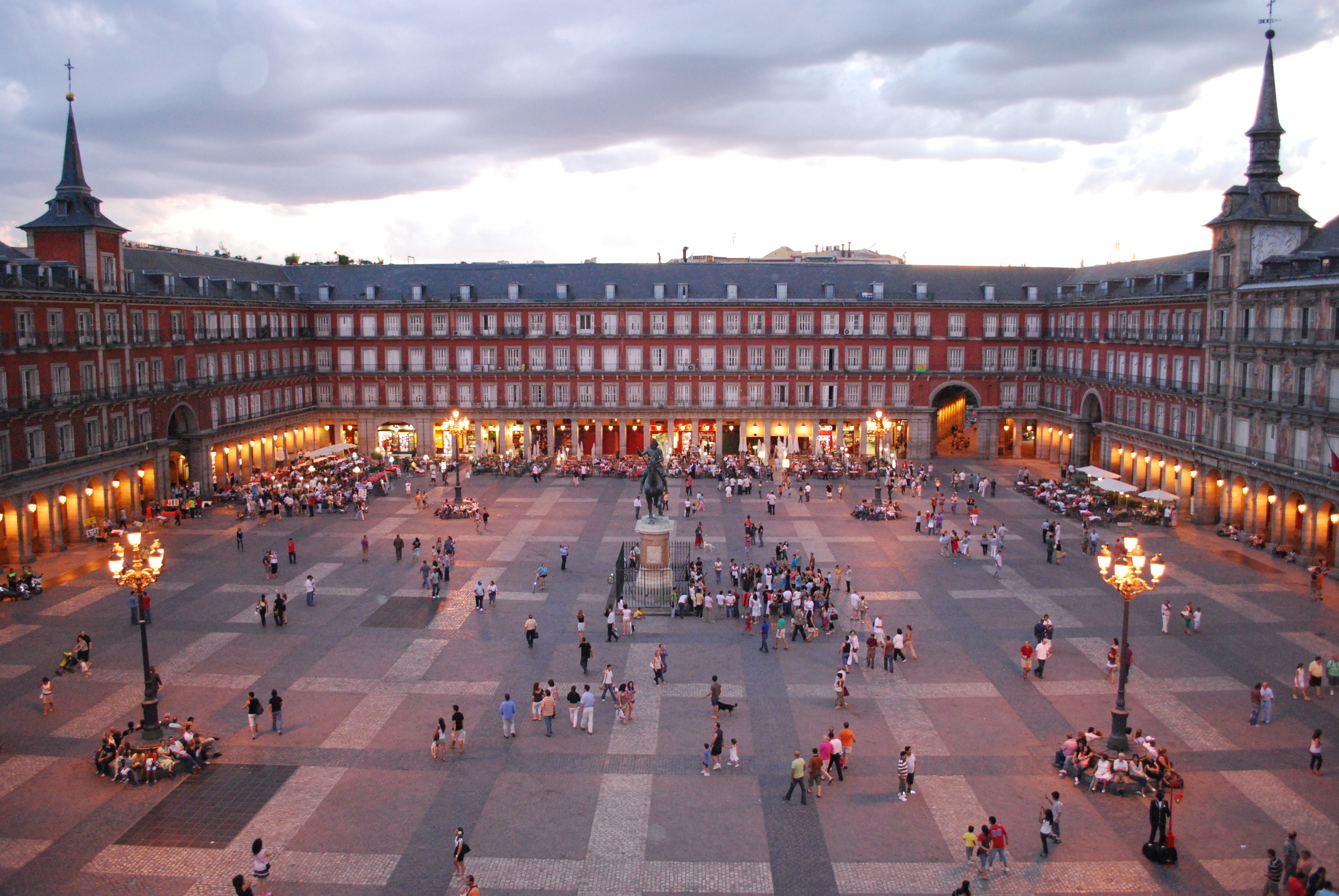
Plaza Mayor built in 1619 during the reign of Philip III

The Plaza Mayor in Madrid, built during the Habsburg period, is a central plaza in the city of Madrid, Spain. It is located only a few blocks away from another famous plaza, the Puerta del Sol. The Plaza Mayor is rectangular in shape, measuring 129 by 94 meters, and is surrounded by three-story residential buildings having 237 balconies facing the Plaza. It has a total of nine entranceways. The Casa de la Panadería, serving municipal and cultural functions, dominates the Plaza Mayor.

The origins of the Plaza date back to 1589 when Philip II of Spain asked Juan de Herrera, a renowned Renaissance architect, to discuss a plan to remodel the busy and chaotic area of the old Plaza del Arrabal. Juan de Herrera was the architect who designed the first project in 1581 to remodel the old Plaza del Arrabal but construction did not start until 1617, during Philip III's reign. The king asked Juan Gómez de Mora to continue with the project, and he finished the porticoes in 1619. Nevertheless, the Plaza Mayor as we know it today is the work of the architect Juan de Villanueva who was entrusted with its reconstruction in 1790 after a spate of big fires. Giambologna's equestrian statue of Philip III dates to 1616, but it was not placed in the center of the square until 1848.

=== Granada Cathedral ===
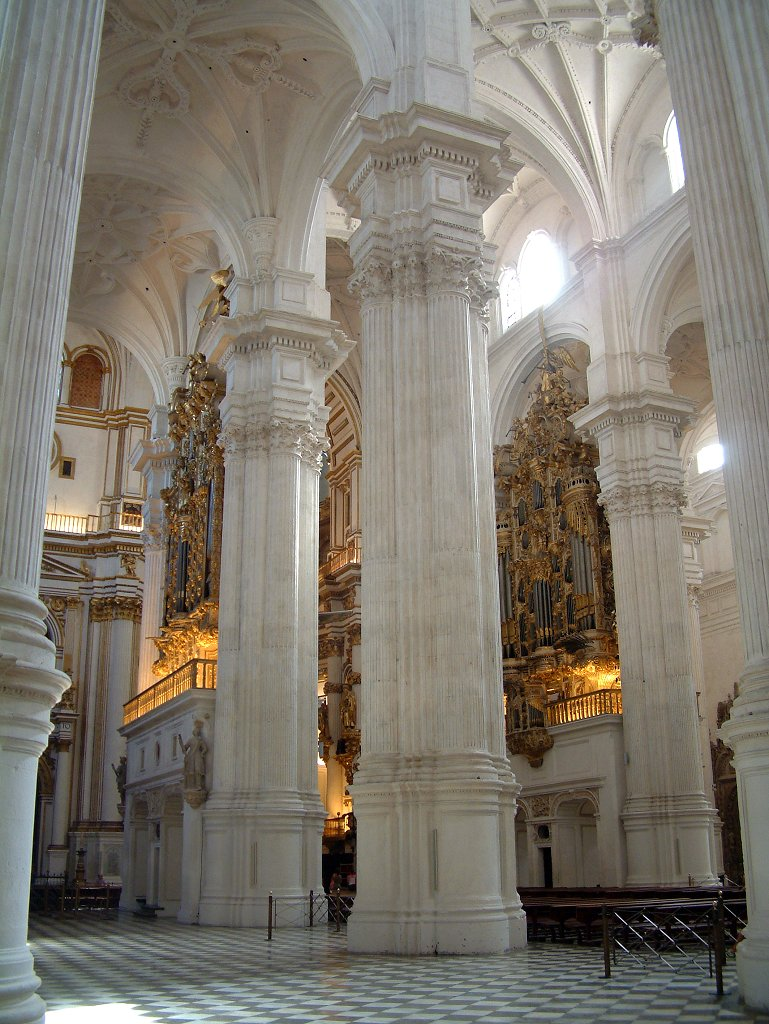
Inner view of Granada Cathedral

Unlike most cathedrals in Spain, construction of this cathedral had to await the acquisition of the Nasrid kingdom of Granada from its Muslim rulers in 1492. While its very early plans had Gothic designs, such as are evident in the Royal Chapel of Granada by Enrique Egas, the construction of the church in the main occurred at a time when Renaissance designs were supplanting the Gothic regnant in Spanish architecture of prior centuries. Foundations for the church were laid by the architect Egas starting from 1518 to 1523 atop the site of the city's main mosque; by 1529, Egas was replaced by Diego de Siloé who labored for nearly four decades on the structure from ground to cornice, planning the triforium and five naves instead of the usual three. Most unusually, he created a circular capilla mayor rather than a semicircular apse, perhaps inspired by Italian ideas for circular 'perfect buildings' (e.g., in Alberti's works). Within its structure the cathedral combines other orders of architecture. It took 181 years for the cathedral to be built.

Subsequent architects included Juan de Maena (1563–1571), followed by Juan de Orea (1571–1590), and Ambrosio de Vico (1590–?). In 1667, Alonso Cano, working with Gaspar de la Peña, altered the initial plan for the main façade, introducing Baroque elements. The magnificence of the building would be even greater if the two large 81-meter towers foreseen in the plans had been built; however, the project remained incomplete for various reasons, including finance.

Granada Cathedral had been intended to become the royal mausoleum for Charles I of Spain, but Philip II of Spain moved the site for his father and subsequent kings to El Escorial outside of Madrid.

The main chapel contains two kneeling effigies of the Catholic King and Queen, Ferdinand and Isabel, by Pedro de Mena y Medrano. The busts of Adam and Eve were made by Alonso Cano. The Chapel of the Trinity has a marvelous retablo with paintings by El Greco, Alonso Cano, and José de Ribera (The Spagnoletto).

=== Cathedral of Valladolid ===
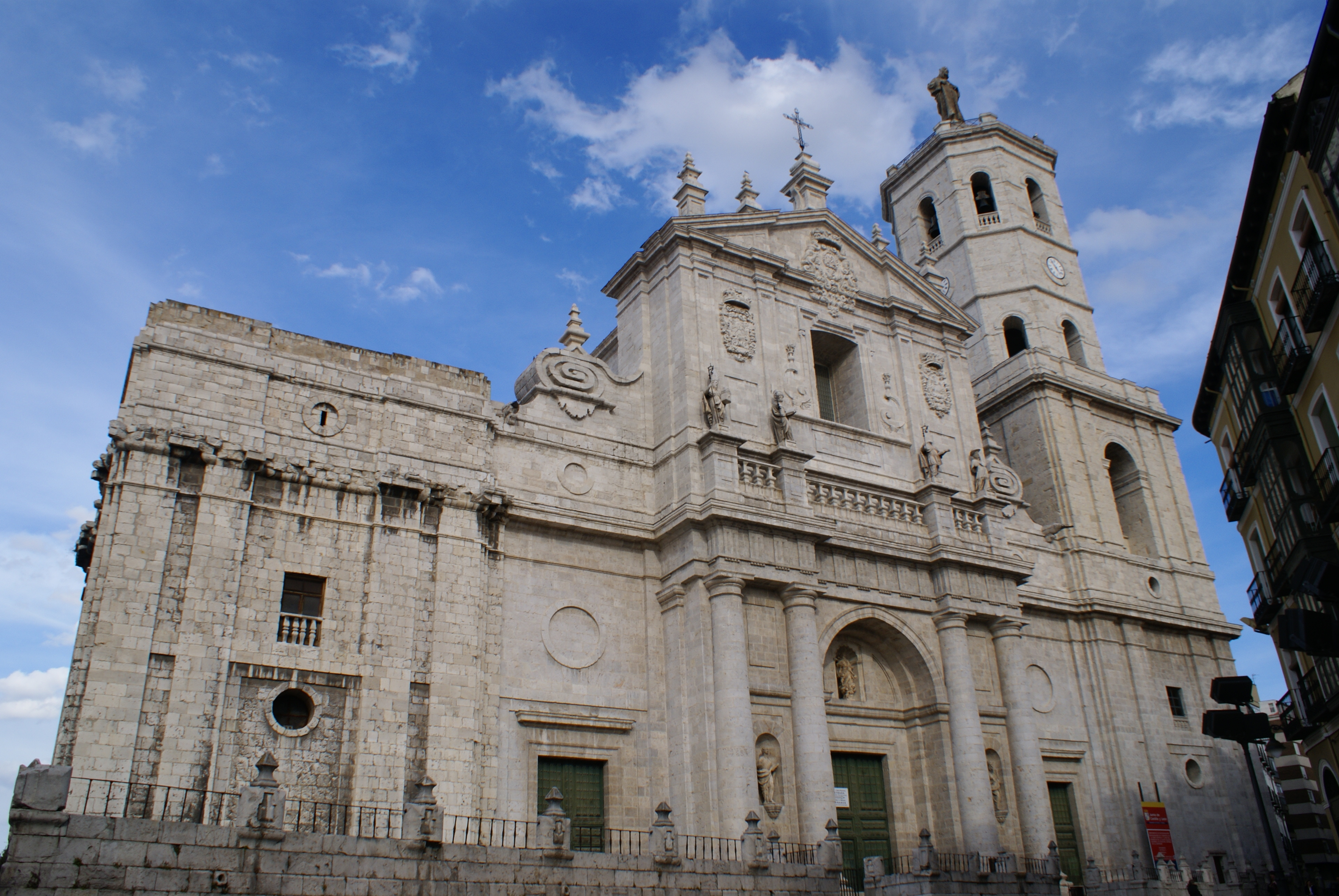
Façade of the Cathedral of Valladolid

The Cathedral of Valladolid, like all the buildings of the late Spanish Renaissance built by Herrera and his followers, is known for its purist and sober decoration, with its style being typical Spanish clasicismo, also called "Herrerian". Using classical and Renaissance decorative motifs, Herrerian buildings are characterized by their extremely sober decorations, their formal austerity, and its like for monumentality.

The cathedral has its origins in a late Gothic college that started in the late 15th century. Before becoming the capital of Spain, Valladolid was not a bishopric and thus lacked the right to build a cathedral. Soon enough, though, the Collegiate became obsolete due to the changes of preference during the period, and thanks to the newly established episcopal in the city, the Town Council decided to build a cathedral that would share similar architecture to neighboring capitals.

Had the building been finished, it would have been one of the biggest cathedrals in Spain. When the building was started, Valladolid was the de facto capital of Spain, housing King Philip II and his court. However, due to strategic and geopolitical reasons, by the 1560s, the capital was moved to Madrid, making Valladolid lose its political and economic relevance. By the late sixteenth century, Valladolid's importance had been severely reduced, and many of the monumental projects, such as the cathedral, started during its prosperous years, had to be modified due to a lack of proper finance. Thus, the building that stands now could not be finished completely, and due to several additions built during the 17th and 18th centuries, it lacks the purported stylistical uniformity sought by Herrera. Although mainly faithful to the project of Juan de Herrera, the building would undergo many modifications.

=== Significant architects ===
==== Renaissance and Plateresque period ====
- Alonso de Covarrubias
- Juan de Herrera
- Rodrigo Gil de Hontañón
- Pedro Machuca
- Francisco de Mora
- Diego de Riaño
- Hernán Ruiz the Younger
- Diego de Siloé
- Juan Bautista de Toledo
- Andrés de Vandelvira

==== Early Baroque period ====
- Domingo Antonio de Andrade
- Eufrasio López de Rojas
- Juan Gómez de Mora

== Music ==
=== Tomás Luis de Victoria ===
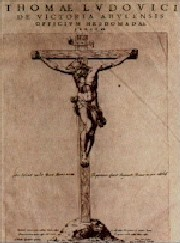
Contemporary printing of the sheet music for Tomás Luis de Victoria's Officium Defunctorum

Tomás Luis de Victoria, a Spanish composer of the sixteenth century, mainly of choral music, is widely regarded as one of the greatest Spanish classical composers. He joined the cause of Ignatius of Loyola in the fight against the Reformation and, in 1575, became a priest. He lived for a short time in Italy, where he became acquainted with the polyphonic work of Giovanni Pierluigi da Palestrina. Like Zurbarán, Victoria mixed the technical qualities of Italian art with the religion and culture of his native Spain. He invigorated his work with emotional appeal, experimental mystical rhythm, and choruses. He broke from the dominant tendency among his contemporaries by avoiding complex counterpoint, preferring longer, simpler, less technical, and more mysterious melodies, and employing dissonance in ways that the Italian members of the Roman School shunned. He demonstrated considerable invention in musical thought by connecting the tone and emotion of his music to those of his lyrics, particularly in his motets. Like Velázquez, Victoria was employed by the monarch – in Victoria's case, in the service of the queen. The Officium Defunctorum (Requiem) he wrote upon her death in 1603 is regarded as one of his most enduring and complex works.

=== Francisco Guerrero ===
Francisco Guerrero, a Spanish composer of the 16th century. He was second only to Victoria as a major Spanish composer of church music in the second half of the 16th century. Of all the Spanish Renaissance composers, he was the one who mostly lived and worked in Spain. Others, e.g., Morales and Victoria, spent large portions of their careers in Italy. Guerrero's music was both religious and secular, unlike that of Victoria and Morales, the two other Spanish 16th-century composers of the first rank. He wrote numerous secular songs and instrumental pieces, in addition to masses, motets, and passions. He was able to capture an astonishing variety of moods in his music, from elation to despair, longing, depression, and devotion. His music remained popular for hundreds of years, especially in cathedrals in Latin America. Stylistically, he preferred homophonic textures rather than Spanish contemporaries. One feature of his style is how he anticipated functional harmonic usage: there is a case of a Magnificat discovered in Lima, Peru, once thought to be an anonymous 18th century work, which turned out to be his work.

=== Alonso Lobo ===
Victoria's work was complemented by Alonso Lobo – a man Victoria respected as his equal. Lobo's work—also choral and religious in its content – stressed the austere, minimalist nature of religious music. Lobo sought out a medium between the emotional intensity of Victoria and the technical ability of Palestrina; the solution he found became the foundation of the Baroque musical style in Spain.

=== Cristóbal de Morales ===
Regarded as one of the finest composers in Europe around the middle of the 16th century, Cristóbal de Morales was born in Seville in 1500 and employed in Rome from 1535 until 1545 by the Vatican. Almost all of his music is religious, and all of it is vocal, though instruments may have been used in an accompanying role in performance. Morales also wrote two masses on the famous L'homme armé melody, which was often set by composers in the late 15th and 16th centuries. One of these masses is for four voices, and the other for five. The four voice mass uses the tune as a strict cantus firmus, and the setting for five voices treats it more freely, migrating it from one voice to another.

=== Other significant musicians ===
- Antonio de Cabezón
- Francisco Correa de Arauxo
- Juan Cabanilles
- Juan del Encina
- Luis Milán
- Luis de Narváez
- Enríquez de Valderrábano
- Diego Pisador
- Alonso Mudarra
- Pablo Bruna

== Literature ==
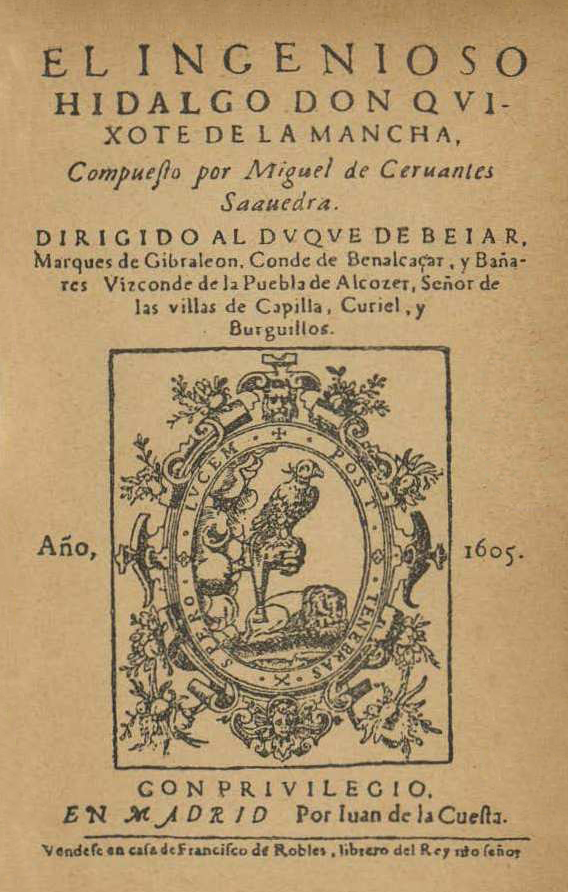
Cervantes' Don Quixote (1605), original title page

The Spanish Golden Age was a period of remarkable growth in poetry, prose, and drama, driven by Spain's deep engagement with European literary and philosophical currents, particularly its strong connections to Renaissance Italy. A Spanish college in Bologna (1360s) enabled scholars like Antonio de Nebrija to study abroad, while Alfonso V of Aragon transformed Naples into a cultural hub (1442). Spanish intellectuals traveled to Italy, absorbing influences from Petrarch, Boccaccio, and Sannazaro, while Italian scholars were welcomed in Spain. This exchange also revived interest in classical literature (Virgil, Horace, Ovid) and Neoplatonism, enriching Spanish language and thought. Francisco de Medrano, a lyric poet from Seville, is considered one of the best of the Spanish imitators of Horace, comparing favorably in that respect with Luis de León.

=== Cervantes and Don Quixote ===
Regarded by many as one of the finest works in any language, El ingenioso hidalgo Don Quixote de la Mancha by Miguel de Cervantes was the first novel published in Europe; it gave Cervantes a stature in the Spanish-speaking world comparable to his contemporary William Shakespeare in English. The novel, like Spain itself, was caught between the Middle Ages and the modern world. A veteran of the Battle of Lepanto, with a dual career in las armas y las letras, Cervantes had fallen on hard times in the late 1590s and was imprisoned for debt in 1597, and some believe that during these years he began work on his best-remembered novel. The first part of the novel was published in 1605; the second in 1615, a year before the author's death. Don Quixote resembled both the medieval, chivalric romances of an earlier time and the novels of the early modern world. It parodied classical morality and chivalry, found comedy in knighthood, and criticized social structures and the perceived madness of Spain's rigid society. The work has endured to the present day as a landmark in world literary history, and it was an international hit in its own time, interpreted variously as a satirical comedy, social commentary and forebear of self-referential literature.

=== Lope de Vega and comedia ===
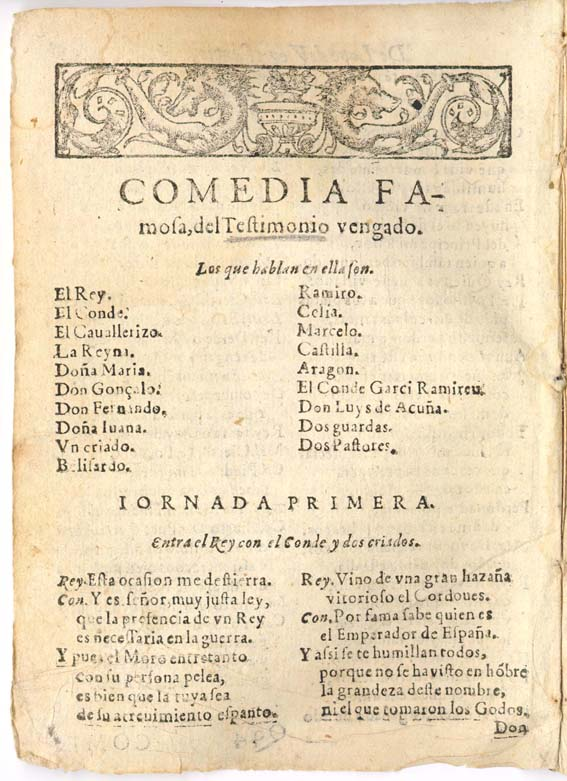
Title page of a comedy by Spanish playwright Lope de Vega

A contemporary of Cervantes, Lope de Vega played a key role in shaping Spanish commercial drama, known as comedia, by defining its essential genres and structures throughout the 17th century. All comedia was reviewed by Dr. Sebastián Francisco de Medrano, a commissioner of the Spanish Inquisition, who served as its official censor.

Although he also wrote prose and poetry, Lope de Vega is best remembered for his plays, particularly those rooted in Spanish history. Like Cervantes, he served in the Spanish army and was deeply interested in the nobility. Lope de Vega's vast body of work—ranging from Biblical and classical mythology to legendary and contemporary Spanish history—often incorporated humor, much like Cervantes. He frequently transformed conventional moral plays by infusing them with wit, cynicism, and comedic elements, aiming primarily to entertain the public. His ability to blend morality, comedy, drama, and popular appeal has drawn comparisons to Shakespeare.

As a social critic, Lope de Vega—like Cervantes—challenged traditional Spanish institutions, including the aristocracy, chivalry, and rigid moral codes. His artistic approach contrasted with the religious asceticism of Francisco Zurbarán. His cloak-and-sword plays, which combined intrigue, romance, and comedy, influenced his literary successor, Pedro Calderón de la Barca, who continued the tradition into the late 17th century.

=== Poetry ===
This period also produced some of the most important Spanish works of poetry. The introduction and influence of Italian Renaissance verse are apparent perhaps most vividly in the works of Garcilaso de la Vega and illustrate a profound influence on later poets. Mystical literature in Spanish reached its summit with the works of San Juan de la Cruz and Teresa of Ávila. Baroque poetry was dominated by the contrasting styles of Francisco de Quevedo and Luis de Góngora; both had a lasting influence on subsequent writers and even on the Spanish language itself.

Lope de Vega was a gifted poet of his own, and there were a vast quantity of remarkable poets at that time, though less known: Francisco de Rioja, Bartolomé Leonardo de Argensola, Lupercio Leonardo de Argensola, Bernardino de Rebolledo, Rodrigo Caro, and Andrés Rey de Artieda. Another poet was Sor Juana Inés de la Cruz, from the Spanish colonies overseas in New Spain (modern day Mexico).

The picaresque genre flourished in this era, describing the life of pícaros, living by their wits in a decadent society. Distinguished examples are El buscón, by Francisco de Quevedo, Guzmán de Alfarache by Mateo Alemán, Estebanillo González and the anonymously published Lazarillo de Tormes (1554), which created the genre.

=== Other significant authors ===
- Juana Inés de la Cruz was a Mexican writer, philosopher, composer, poet of the Baroque period, and Hieronymite nun. She wrote poetry and prose dealing with such topics as love, feminism, and religion. In addition to the two comedies; Pawns of a House (Los empeños de una casa) and Love is but a Labyrinth (Amor es mas laberinto), Sor Juana is attributed as the author of a possible ending to the comedy by Agustin de Salazar, The Second Celestina (La Segunda Celestina).
- Alonso de Ercilla wrote the epic poem La Araucana about the Spanish conquest of Chile.
- Gil Vicente was Portuguese, but his influence on Spanish playwriting was so wide that he is often considered part of the Spanish Golden Era.
- Francisco de Avellaneda was a prolific writer of short comedies and dances.

Other well-known playwrights of the period include:

- Alonso de Castillo Solórzano
- Tirso de Molina
- Agustín Moreto
- Juan Pérez de Montalbán
- Juan Ruiz de Alarcón
- Guillén de Castro
- Antonio Mira de Amescua

== Rhetoric ==
As elsewhere in Europe, Spanish scholars participated in the humanist recovery and theorizing of Greek and Roman rhetorics. Early Spanish humanists include Antonio Nebrija and Juan Luis Vives. Spanish rhetoricians who discussed Ciceronianism include Juan Lorenzo Palmireno and Pedro Juan Núñez. Famous Spanish Ramists include Francisco Sánchez de las Brozas, Pedro Juan Núñez, Fadrique Furió Ceriol, and Luis de Verga. Many other rhetoricians turned to Greek rhetorics from Hermogenes and Longinus which were preserved by Byzantine scholars, especially George of Trebizond. These Byzantine-inspired Spanish rhetoricians include Antonio Lull, Pedro Juan Núñez, and Luis de Granada. There were also many translators of progymnasmata, including Francisco de Vergara, Francisco Escobar, Juan de Mal Lara, Juan Pérez, Antonio Lull, Juan Lorenzo Palmireno, and Pedro Juan Núñez. Another important Spanish rhetorician is Cypriano Soarez, whose rhetorical handbook was a key textbook in the Jesuit Ratio studiorum which was used in Jesuit education throughout the Spanish empire. Diego de Valadés's Rhetorica christiana is the first Western rhetoric published by a native of México. Besides Soarez's De arte rhetorica, the progymnasmata by Pedro Juan Núñez was also published in Mexico City. Examples of Nahua oratory (huehuetlatolli) were collected by Andrés de Olmos and Bernardino de Sahagún.

== See also ==
- History of Spain
- Renaissance
- School of Salamanca
- Spanish Baroque painting
- Spanish poetry
- Black legend
- Decline of Spain
