= Aquila Romanus =

Aquila Romanus was a Latin grammarian who flourished in the second half of the 3rd century AD.

== Life ==
He was the author of an extant treatise De Figuris Sententiarum et Elocutionis, written as an installment of a complete rhetorical handbook for the use of a young and eager correspondent. While recommending Demosthenes and Cicero as models, he takes his own examples almost exclusively from Cicero. His treatise is really adapted from that by Alexander, son of Numenius, as is expressly stated by Julius Rufinianus, who brought out a supplementary treatise, augmented by material from other sources. According to the Encyclopædia Britannica Eleventh Edition, Aquila's style is harsh and careless, and the Latin is inferior.

== Work ==
- "De Figuris Sententiarum et Elocutionis", in Karl Halm. Rhetores Latini minores, p. 22, at Google Books. Leipzig: B. G. Teubner, 1863
- P. Rutilii Lupi de figuris sententiarum et elocutions libri duo, accedunt Aquilae Romani et Julii Rufiniani de eodem argumento libri, David Ruhnken (ed.), Lugduni Batavorum, apud Samuelem et Joannem Luchtmans, 1768, pp. 139 ff.

== Sources ==
- Elice, Romani Aquilae De figuris (Hildesheim : Olms, 2007)
- Karl Halm, Rhetores Latini minores (1863)
- Wensch, De Aquila Romano (1861).
