= Alexander Numenius =

Alexander Numenius (Ancient Greek: Ἀλέξανδρος Νουμήνιος), or (according to the Suda) Alexander, son of Numenius (Ἀλέξανδρος ὁ Νουμηνίου), was a Greek rhetorician who flourished in the first half of the 2nd century. About his life almost nothing is known. We possess two works ascribed to him. The one which certainly is his work bears the title Περὶ τῶν τῆς διανοίας καὶ τῆς λέξεως σχημάτων Peri ton tes dianoias kai tes lexeos schematon. Julius Rufinianus, in his work on the same subject expressly states that Aquila Romanus, in his Latin treatise De Figuris Sententiarum et Elocutionis, took his materials from Alexander's work. Another epitome was made in the 4th century by a Christian for use in Christian schools, containing additional examples from Gregory Nazianzus.

The second work traditionally attributed to Alexander Numenius, titled On Show-Speeches (Περὶ Ἐπιδεικτικῶν), is acknowledged by virtually all critics not the work of this Alexander, but of a later grammarian also named Alexander; that is, made up very clumsily from two distinct works, one of which was written by one Alexander, and the other by Menander Rhetor. The first edition of these two works is the Aldine edition (Rhetores Graeci, Venice, 1508, fol., vol. i. p. 574, &c.). They are also contained in Walz's Rhetores Graeci, vol. viii. The genuine work of Alexander Numenius has also been edited, together with Minucianus and Phoebammon, by L. Normann, with a Latin translation and useful notes, Upsala, 1690, 8vo.

== See also ==
- Aquila Romanus
