= Byzantine rhetoric =

Rhetorical theorizing in the Byzantine Empire

Byzantine rhetoric refers to rhetorical theorizing and production during the time of the Byzantine Empire. Byzantine rhetoric is significant in part because of the sheer volume of rhetorical works produced during this period. Rhetoric was the most important and difficult topic studied in the Byzantine education system, beginning at the Pandidakterion in early fifth century Constantinople, where the school emphasized the study of rhetoric with eight teaching chairs, five in Greek and three in Latin. The hard training of Byzantine rhetoric provided skills and credentials for citizens to attain public office in the imperial service, or posts of authority within the Church.

== Influences ==
Byzantine rhetoric largely followed the precepts of ancient Greek rhetoricians, especially those belonging to the Second Sophistic, including Hermogenes of Tarsus, Menander Rhetor, Aphthonius of Antioch, Libanius, and Alexander Numenius. Another bridge between the Hellenistic tradition of eloquence and Byzantium was the rhetorical school of Gaza that flourished in the fifth and sixth century.

== History ==
Thomas M. Conley divides the history of Byzantine rhetoric into four periods: The Dark Ages, After Iconoclasm, 11th and 12th centuries, and the Paleologan Era.

=== The Dark Ages ===
This period includes the formation of the Hermogenean corpus and associated commentary traditions. These include Sopater of Apamea and Syrianus's commentaries of Hermogenes. Some commentaries compare rhetoric with philosophy.

=== After Iconoclasm ===
After the Iconoclast period, Byzantine scholars collected manuscripts of Greek rhetoricians such as Dionysius of Halicarnassus, Menander Rhetor, and Alexander Numenius. Some important Byzantine figures from this period include Photius, John Geometres, and John of Sardis.

=== 11th and 12th centuries ===
This is the period of the Comnenan emperors. Important Byzantine figures from this period include Michael Psellus, Nikephoros Basilakes, Gregory Pardos of Corinth, and Euthymios Zigabenos. This period includes important epideictic speeches for the emperor called basilikoi logoi, many of which compare emperors to King David.

=== The Paleologan Era ===
This is the period of the Paleologan emperors. The influence of the Latin administration prompted translations of Latin works into Greek and a reluctant return to Aristotle. Important Byzantine figures include Theodore Metochites, Maximus Planudes, Nikephoras Choumnos, George Gemistius Plethon, and George of Trebizond. Theodore Metochites and Nikephoras Choumnos are known for their debates over the value of stylistic obscurity. George of Trebizond is known for introducing Hermogenes to the West; his works contribute to the development of Renaissance rhetoric.

== See also ==
- Byzantine university
- Greek Scholars in the Renaissance
- Rhetoric
