= Pedro Juan Núñez =

Spanish rhetorician

- Born: 1525; Valencia
- Died: 1602 (aged 76–77)

Education
- Education: University of Valencia

Philosophical work
- School: Renaissance humanism Ramism
- Institutions: University of Valencia
- Main interests: Rhetoric, Greek language
- Notable works: Rhetoricae institutionis

Pedro Juan Núñez (Latin: Petrus Joannes Nunnesius or Valentinus Nunnesius; 1525–1602) was a Valencian humanist and educator active during the Spanish Golden Age. He is famous for his rhetorical treatises based on Hermogenes' rhetorical works.

== Life ==
Núñez graduated with a Master of Arts from the University of Valencia in 1546. After graduation, he worked at the University of Valencia as a chair in Greek. Starting in 1550 he studied under Peter Ramus in Paris. Núñez returned to Valencia in 1552 to take a position as a chair in Rhetoric. He also taught Grammar and Latin. While there he composed Rhetoricae institutionis libri quinque (1552), a paraphrase of the four works of the Hermogenean corpus, at the age of 27. Pedro Juan Pepinyá, a famous Jesuit orator, was one of his students. In 1557 he left with Juan Lorenzo Palmireno to work at the University of Zaragoza, but in 1563 returned yet again to the University of Valencia, where he continued to publish on Greek language and rhetoric.

== Works ==
- Artificium orationis Ciceronis pro Caio Rabirio perduellionis reo (1551)
- Oratio de causis obscuritatis Aristoteleae (1554)
- Epitheta M. Tullii Ciceronis collecta (1556)
- Rhetoricae institutionis libri quinque (1556)
  - Critical edition: Ferran Grau Codina. Las retóricas de Pedro Juan Núñez (ediciones y manuscritos). Dissertation, University of Valencia, 1994.
- De situ orbis explanationes in Dionysium Afrum (1562)
- Petitio ad Pontificem Maximum Pium V pro Academia Ilerdensi (1562)
- De ratione interpretandi aliorum scripta (1570)
- Explanatio in Dionysium Periegetam de situ orbis
  - Critical edition: Paulino Pandiella Gutiérrez. La Explanatio in Dionysium Periegetam de situ orbis de Pedro Juan Núñez. Edición crítica y estudio introductorio. Dissertation, University of Oviedo, 2018.
- Alphabetum graecum (1571)
- Tabulae institutionum rhetoricarum (1574)
- Libellus de mutatione linguaese Graecae in Latinam
- Typus institutionum Grammaticarum Etymologiae et sentaxeoos lingua Graecae (1577)
- Phrynichi epitomae dictionum atticarum (1586)
- De Aristotelis doctrina orationes philosophicae tres trium insignium Valentinorum (1591, with Bartolome Jose Pascual and Juan Bautista Monllor)
- Progymnasmata, idest, Praeludia quaedam oratoria ex progumansmatis potissimum Aphthonii (1596) (published in Mexico City as well)
- Ratio brevis et expedita conscribendi genera epistolarum (1602)
- Institutionis rhetoricae: ex progumannsmatis protissinaum Aphthonii atque ex Hermegis [sic] arte dictatae (1628) (1577)
- Oratio habita in Academia Valentina ad Philippum III, Margaritam Austicam, reges Albertum et Isabellam, Flandriae duces, qui praesentes scholis adstiterunt
- Ratio imitandi eandem periodum
  - Critical edition: Victoria Pineda. "LA RATIO IMITANDI DE PEDRO JUAN NÚÑEZ". Romanische Forschungen. 105 (3/4), 1993, pp. 302–314.
