= Fadrique Furió Ceriol =

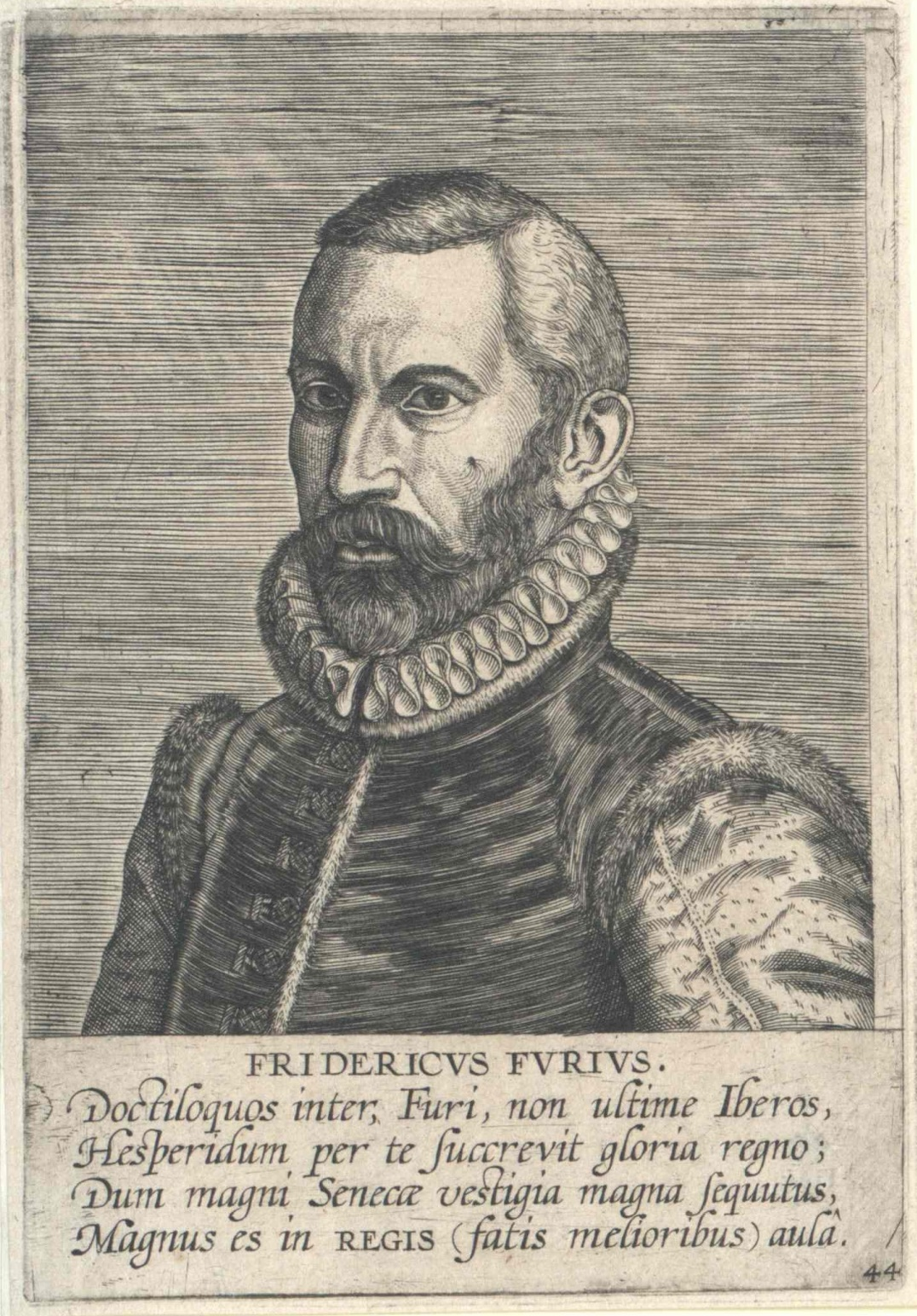
- Fadrique Furió Ceriol
- Born: May 24, 1527; Valencia, Kingdom of Spain
- Died: 12 August 1592 (aged 64–65); Valladolid, Kingdom of Spain
- Occupation: renaissance humanist
- Years active: Spanish Golden Age
- Known for: Innovations in rhetorical theory, arguments for Bible translation into vernacular languages, innovations in political theory

Academic background
- Education: University of Louvain
- Influences: Erasmus; Ramus; Juan Luis Vives; Omer Talon; Adrianus Turnebus

Academic work
- Discipline: Political Science, Theology, Rhetoric
- Influenced: Thomas Blundeville

Miquel Joan Ceriol i Balle (24 May 1527 - August 12, 1592), also known as Fridericus Furius Caeriolanus or Fadrique Furió Ceriol, was a Valencian humanist active during the Spanish Golden Age. He is known primarily for his rhetorical treatise Institutionum Rhetoricarum libri tres; Bononia, an argument for vernacular Bible translation; and El Concejo, i consejeros del Príncipe, an important addition to the realpolitik tradition of the mirror of princes genre after Machiavelli's Il Principe.

== Biography ==
Miquel Joan was born in Valencia on May 24, 1527. He studied at the University of Paris with Peter Ramus, Omer Talon, and Adrianus Turnebus, but had to leave Paris in 1551 due to anti-Spanish sentiment during the Italian War of 1551-1559. He participated with Charles V in the siege of Metz in 1552. He completed his studies at the University of Louvain, where he obtained his doctorate in civil and canon law.

While at Louvain, he Latinized his name as Fridericus Furius Caeriolanus. Under this name, he published his three best known works, Institutionum Rhetoricarum libri tres (1554); Bononia, sive de libris sacris in vernaculam liguam conuertendis, libri duo (1556); and El Concejo, i consejeros del Príncipe (1559).

In 1556, he was briefly imprisoned by order of King Phillip II for publishing Bononia, in which he advocated for more vernacular translations of the Bible, which raised suspicions that he was sympathetic to the Protestant Reformation. Bononia was listed on the index of prohibited books in 1559. In 1560, Furio fled to Liege and then to Cologne, where he stayed under the protection of a sympathetic Archbishop for three years. His persecutors got a hold of him again and brought him back to Brussels in 1563. All three of his books were under suspicion.

In 1564, Furio finally returned to Spain, where he served as a counselor to the king. He wrote various reports, including pieces of military advice. By 1566, he was making 300 ducats a year.

In 1573, Furio returned to the Spanish Netherlands with the new governor, Don Luis de Requesens y Zúñiga. He wrote Remedios para el sosiego de las alteraciones de los Países Bajos de los Estados de Flandres (1573) to outline his suggestions to resolve conflicts between the Spanish Netherlands and the king. After Requesens' death, Furio returned to Spain by way of Italy.

In 1581, Furio wrote his Petición a Felipe II, requesting a position as vice-chancellor of the Council of Aragon, which went unanswered.

When he died in Valladolid in 1592, Furio freed his slave Ana Gutiérrez and her son Diego. Over the course of his life, he traveled to France, Flanders, England, Germany, Denmark, Austria, and Italy.

== Legacy ==
During his lifetime, El Concejo was well received and quickly translated into Italian, English, Latin, and Polish.

An early Italian translation is Lodovico Dolce's Il Concilio overo Consiglio et i consiglieri del Prencipe (1560).

An early English translation is Thomas Blundeville's A very briefe and profitable Treatise declaring hovve many counsells, and vvhat maner of Counselers a Prince that will gouerne vvel ought to haue (1570).

There is a named professorship at the University of Valencia in his name.

There is also an academic journal in his name that ran from 1992 to 2009.

== Works ==
- Institutionum Rhetoricarum libri tres (1554)
- Bononia, sive de libris sacris in vernaculam liguam conuertendis, libri duo (1556)
- El Concejo, i consejeros del Príncipe (1559)
- Gramática de la Lengua Vulgar de España (1559)
- Comedia llamada Josephina (1559)
- Remedios para el sosiego de las alteraciones de los Países Bajos de los Estados de Flandes (1573)
- Avisos acerca de los Estados Bajos (1566)
- Medios para la pacificación de los Estados Baxos (1578)
- Petición a Felipe II (1581)
- Del uso o abuso común de los títulos (1583).
