= Genethlius =

Genethlius (Greek: Γενέθλιος, romanized: Genéthlios) was a 3rd-century Arab sophist from Petra, Arabia Petraea. His father was also named Genethlius.

He was a pupil of the Greek sophists Minucianus (Ancient Greek: Μινουκιανός) and Agapetus (Ancient Greek: Ἀγαπητός), and then he himself became a teacher and practiced rhetoric in Athens. He has been known as a rival to the famous Callinicus of Petra.

Genethlius is also thought by some scholars to be the author of the first treatise in the corpus of Menander Rhetor.
