= Byzantine university =

Institutions in the Byzantine Empire

Byzantine university refers to higher education during the Byzantine Empire.

== Definition ==
Although some Byzantine institutions are occasionally referred to as "universities" on grounds they were centers of higher education, the Byzantine world, unlike the Latin West, did not know universities in the strict and original sense of the term. Higher education was rather provided by private teachers, professional groups, and state-appointed teachers, but not by the permanent corporations (Latin universitas) of the medieval university.

== History ==
In the early period Rome, Athens, and Alexandria were the main centers of learning, but were overtaken in the 5th century by the new capital, Constantinople. After the Platonic Academy closed in 529, only a few other important centers remained apart from Constantinople such as Law school of Berytus for legal studies and the Rhetorical school of Gaza with its focus on rhetoric and classical philosophy. When Alexandria, Beirut and Gaza were conquered by the Muslims in the mid seventh century, the focus of all higher learning moved to Constantinople.

After Constantinople's founding in 330, teachers were drawn to the new city and various steps were taken for official state support and supervision, but nothing lastingly formal in the way of state-funded education emerged. But in 425 Theodosius II founded the Pandidacterium, described as "the first deliberate effort of the Byzantine state to impose its control on matters relating to higher education." This established a clear distinction between private teachers and public (paid from imperial funds) ones. Official teachers enjoyed privilege and prestige. There were a total of 31: 10 each for Greek and Latin grammar; two for law; one for philosophy; and eight chairs for rhetoric, with five taught in Greek and three in Latin. This system lasted with various degrees of official support until the 7th century. Byzantine rhetoric was the most important and difficult topic studied in the Byzantine education system, forming a basis for citizens to attain public office in the imperial service, or posts of authority within the Church. Along with the dominance of Byzantine intellectual life by imperial patronage came imperial scrutiny of the higher schools' curriculum and staff.

In the 7th and 8th centuries Byzantine life went through a difficult period. Continued Arab pressure from the south and the Slavs, Avars, and Bulgars to the north led to dramatic economic decline and transformation of Byzantine life. But higher education continued to receive some official funding, the details of which are not well known to scholars, but it is assumed the quality of the education was probably lower than before.

With improving stability in the 9th century came measures to improve the quality of higher education. In 863 chairs of grammar, rhetoric, and philosophy (which included mathematics, astronomy, and music) were founded and given a permanent location in the imperial palace. These chairs continued to receive official state support for the next century and a half, after which the Church assumed the leading role in providing higher education. During the 12th century the Patriarchal School was the leading center of education which included men of letters such as Theodore Prodromos and Eustathius of Thessalonica.

The Crusaders's capture of Constantinople in 1204 during the Fourth Crusade ended all support for higher education, although the government in exile in Nicaea gave some support to individual private teachers. After the restoration in 1261 attempts were made to restore the old system, but it never fully recovered and most teaching fell to private teachers and professors. Some of these private teachers included the diplomat and monk Maximos Planudes (1260–1310), the historian Nikephoros Gregoras (1291–1360), and the man of letters Manuel Chrysoloras, who taught in Florence and influenced the early Italian humanists on Greek studies. In the 15th century, following the Fall of Constantinople, many more teachers from the City would follow in Chrysoloras' footsteps.

== See also ==
- University of Constantinople
