= Hermogenes of Tarsus =

2nd-century Greek rhetorician

Hermogenes of Tarsus (Ancient Greek: Ἑρμογένης ὁ Ταρσεύς; fl. c. 170) was a Greek rhetorician, surnamed The Polisher (Ξυστήρ, xustḗr). He flourished in the reign of Marcus Aurelius (161–180 AD).

== Life and work ==
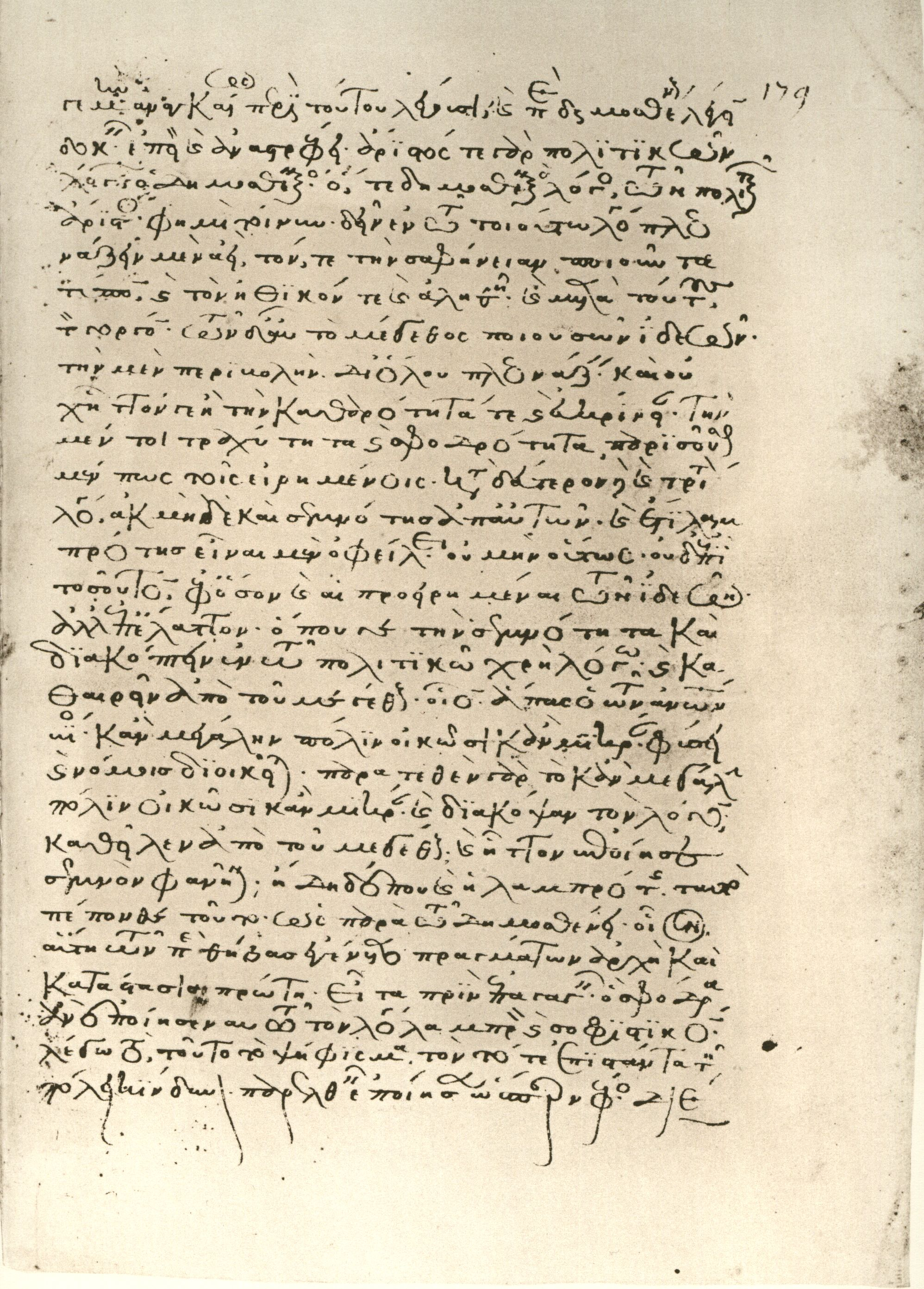
De ideis (Peri ideon) in ms. Biblioteca Apostolica Vaticana, Vaticanus graecus 103, fol. 179r.

His precocious ability secured him a public appointment as teacher of his art while he was only a boy, attracting the note of the emperor Marcus Aurelius himself; but at the age of twenty-five his faculties gave way, and he spent the remainder of his long life in a state of intellectual impotence. Allegedly, Antiochus used to taunt him: "Lo, here is one who was an old man among boys and now among the old is but a boy." The Suda records a rumor that after his death his heart was found to be enormous and covered in hair.

During his early years, however, he had composed a series of rhetorical treatises, which became very popular textbooks in Byzantium, and the subject of subsequent commentaries. We still possess some sections:

- Προγυμνάσματα – On rhetorical exercises (progymnasmata).
- Περὶ στάσεων – On legal issues (staseis)
- Περὶ εὑρέσεως – On the invention of arguments
- Περὶ ἰδεῶν – On various kinds of style (or On types of style)
- On the method of forcefulness

Among these works, the progymnasmata, the work on invention and On the Method of Forcefulness are considered to be spurious.

In On Types of Style, Hermogenes identifies seven elements of style, rather than the traditional three (high, medium and low). First is clarity, because of its importance. Clarity is subdivided into purity, which is sentence-level clarity, and distinctness, which is about overall organization. The next category, grandeur is subdivided into six parts, but generally clumped into four sections: solemnity and brilliance are the first section and are very similar. Solemnity is using short, abstract statements about elevated topics; brilliance takes those abstracts down to specifics, and is longer. The third part of grandeur is amplification. The last section of grandeur comprises three parts: asperity, vehemence and florescence. Asperity for sharp criticism, vehemence for disdain and florescence to ameliorate strong feelings. The category of beauty is not subdivided. The next type of style is rapidity—quick short sentence, rapid replies, sudden turns of thought in antithesis. The fifth style is ethos which is subdivided into simplicity, sweetness, subtlety and modesty. Simplicity, sweetness and modesty are characterized by simple sentences and diction, differing mainly in terms of subject matter, i.e. with simplicity dealing with simple thoughts, sweetness dealing with mythology and descriptions of nature and modesty acting as a captatio benevolentiae. Subtlety is characterized by "striking words and turns of phrase", i.e. figures of speech which call attention to themselves and make specific points of argument stand out. In addition to these, Hermogenes adds the style of indignation, which is characterized by the orator expressing incredulity and indignation. The last style, gravity, is the correct balance of all six of these types of style.

According to Hagedorn, the types of style described in On Types of Style are not unique to Hermogenes, but had already been described in some form by Dionysius of Halicarnassus. Hermogenes lists several authors exemplifying the ideas of style, with Demosthenes acting as the prime model of how to blend the types of style appropriately in a work of oratory. The very fact that the ideas of style echo the Classical Greek literary canon is in harmony with rhetorical practises during the Second Sophistic, where sophists relied on the imitation of Classical Greek literature to restage Classical Greek history, for instance in their declamations. Several of the types of style include literary, cultural and historical allusions (i.e. solemnity, brilliance, sweetness and indignation), thereby allowing orators to showcase their paideia or symbolic capital, which in turn allowed orators to demonstrate their affiliation with the ruling class.

The Hermogenean corpus also includes work on stasis theory (points of dispute), i.e. in On Issues and On Invention. On Issues subdivides the four stases identified by Hermagoras into 13 different sub-stases and includes specific rhetorical strategies conducive to the stases. The work is notable also for its list of political stases (pragmatiké), i.e. legality, justice, usefulness, possibility, honour and consequences, which are conducive to deliberative speeches. While not by Hermogenes, On Invention shows how stasis points or "headings" can be fleshed out by means of ergasia. Here, the orator first argues for or against a proposition by using the topics of circumstance (place, time, manner, agent, reason and action), an argument which is fleshed out by means of parallels or comparison (the topics are comparison, example, the lesser, the greater, the similar or the opposite) and given a pointed and memorable expression in an enthymeme (based on circumstance) and possibly an epenthymeme (based on parallel). Interestingly, Hermogenes describes this argumentation device in On Types of Style in his treatment of abundance/amplification.

The stylistic term δριμύτης (strikingness) employed by Hermogenes in On Types of Style is employed in On Invention as well, where the anonymous author regards this stylistic quality as especially suitable for enthymemes. The effect of strikingness, which enhances the memorability of the enthymeme, is produced by condensation or brevity, similar to the category of rapidity in On Types of Style. Among figures of speech, the author highlights antithesis as having a striking effect. In contemporary communication, the effect of strikingness could be compared to the condensed slogans in political rhetoric and commercials. Ps.-Hermogenes distinguishes between the striking, concise Demosthenic periods (i.e. sentences with more subordinate clauses) conducive to political oratory with the long-stretched periods appropriate for panegyric speeches (called pneumata).

== Editions and translations ==
Hermogenes was very popular in Byzantine education. George of Trebizond, a Byzantine scholar, introduced Hermogenes to Western Europe during the Renaissance through his Rhetoricorum libri V (1470). Trebizond´s handbook incorporates material from Hermogenes´ On Stases and On Types of Style with the anonymous Rhetoric to Herennius. The famous publisher Aldus Manutius introduced the Hermogenean rhetorical corpus to the Western European reader in the Rhetores Graeci (1508). Hermogenes is cited by Juan Luis Vives, and was influential on Johannes Sturm. Sturm published translations and commentaries on most of Hermogenes´s works. Hermogenes was also influential on Spanish rhetoricians such as Antonio Lull, Pedro Juan Núñez, and Luis de Granada. Lull and Núñez published versions of Hermogenes's progymnasmata, and Núñez´s Rhetoricae institutionis draws significantly on the entire Hermogenic corpus.

The 19th century Hugo Rabe edition of the Opera Hermogenis, with Latin introduction, is based upon various editions, among others, the Aldine edition.

Michel Patillon has translated the entire Hermogenic corpus into French, with copious annotations. Malcolm Heath has translated On Issues (Περὶ στάσεων) into English, and Cecil W. Wooten has translated On Types of Style into English. A Dutch translation of On Types of Style appeared in late 2006.

== Work on Hermogenes' influence ==
Mikael Johansson has tried to apply the unique rhetorical schemes in Pseudo-Hermogenes' work on rhetorical invention on some of the declamations of Libanius.

Annabel Patterson wrote a book about Hermogenean style, rhetorical categories, and its influence on Renaissance writers, such as William Shakespeare. The influence of Hermogenean stylistics on Renaissance literature is further corroborated by Scheler, who has investigated Hermogenean influences in the poetry of George Herbert, Ramsay, who detects Hermogenean influences in the poetry of Ben Jonson, and Raty, who investigates the Hermogenean aesthetics of hybridity and mixture in English Renaissance literary criticism. Hugh Blair also mentions Hermogenes in his work on rhetoric. In addition, Debora Shuger argues for Hermogenes' huge influence on Renaissance theo-rhetoric and homiletics, with the sublime simplicity of types of style such as solemnity offering an alternative to Ciceronian stylistics, which views the grand and low styles as opposites. According to Shuger, Hermogenean stylistics was operationalized in the realm of Bible hermeneutics by Salomo Glassius and Matthias Flacius Illyricus, with works on homiletics by e.g. Nicholas Caussin borrowing heavily from Hermogenes' On Types of Style. Glassius and Illyricus detected all styles described by Hermogenes in their readings of the Bible.

== Other people ==
There seems to have been yet another Hermogenes of Tarsus, remembered for being put to death by Emperor Domitian because of some allusions in his History.
