= Pedro Juan Pepinyá =

Spanish Jesuit humanist (b. 1530)

Reverend Pedro Juan Pepinyá
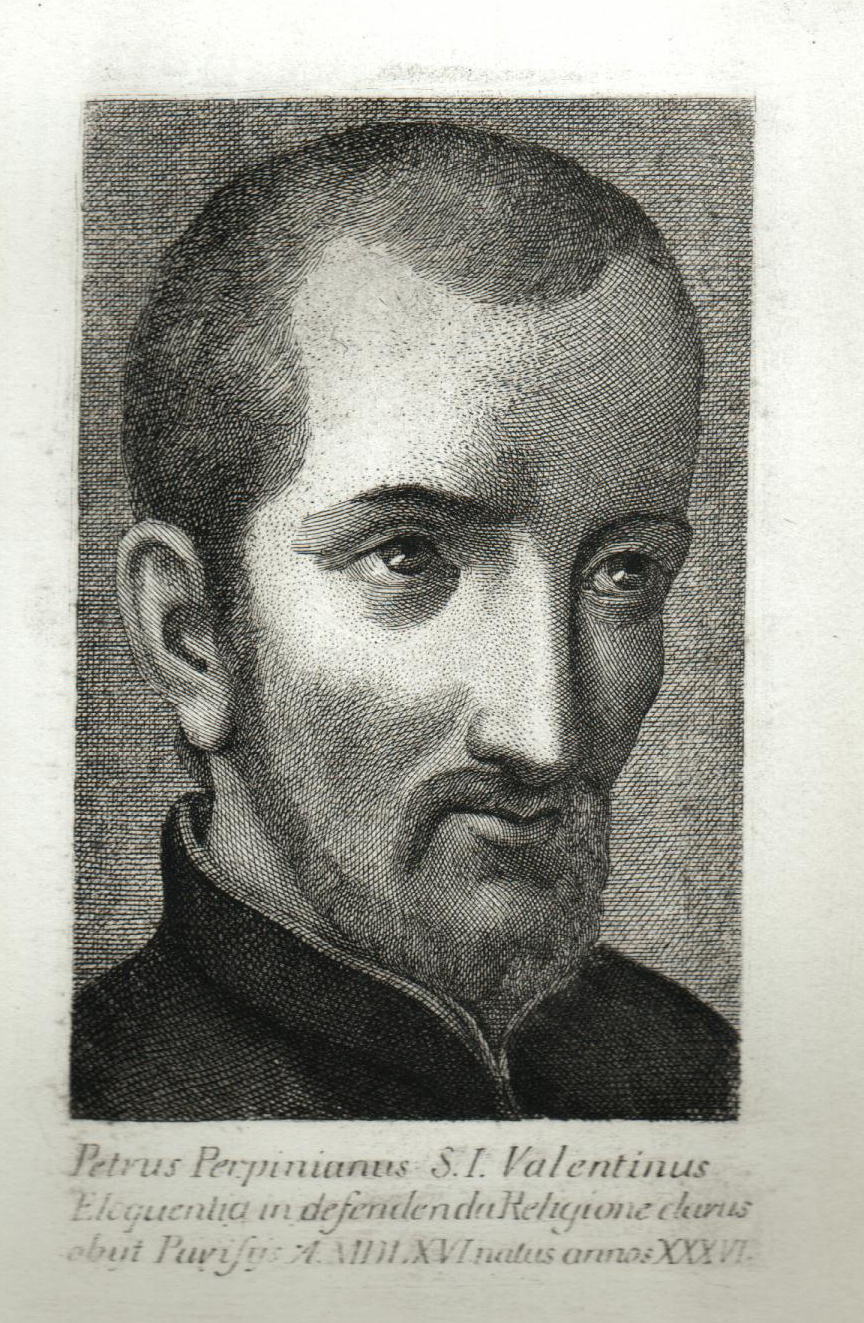
- Pedro Juan Pepinyá
- Born: 1530; Elche, Kingdom of Spain
- Died: 28 October 1566 (aged 35–36); Paris, Kingdom of France
- Occupations: Jesuit priest, renaissance humanist, university teacher, latinist
- Known for: His contribution to the development of the Jesuit Coimbra Commentaries on Aristotle

Academic background
- Education: University of Valencia
- Doctoral advisor: Pedro Juan Núñez
- Influences: Aristotle; Cicero; Juan Luis Vives

Academic work
- Discipline: Rhetoric
- Institutions: Roman College
- Influenced: Francesco Adorno

Pedro Juan Pepinyá, S.J. (1530 - October 28, 1566) was a Spanish Jesuit humanist who contributed to the development of the Jesuit Cursus Conimbricensis commentaries on Aristotle and who revised Cypriano Soarez' De arte rhetorica.

== Life ==
Pepinyá was born at Elche in Valencia to Melchior Pepinyá and Eleanora Clapes. He began his studies at a school in Oriheula, and later went to the University of Valencia where Juan Luis Vives had previously studied. There, Pepinyá studied under Pedro Juan Núñez; his other instructors included Juan de Celaya, Miguel Hieronymus, Jerome Ledesma, and Juan Blasius Navarro. Pepinyá received his bachelor's degree on July 6, 1541. He and his brother Luis joined the Jesuit order on September 30, 1551. He went to teach rhetoric at the Jesuit college in Lisbon, where he taught alongside Cypriano de Soarez. He regularly gave speeches, including the inaugural address at the University of Coimbra in October 1555. He was ordained a priest by Bishop João Nunes Barreto, Patriarch of Ethiopia the same month. He also delivered the funeral oration for Prince Luis, the brother of King John III of Portugal, in 1555. He then served as court preacher to the Queen from 1557 to 1559. In 1561 he went to help with the Jesuit College in Rome and befriended the Italian humanist Paolo Manuzio. In 1563 he was working on his own rhetoric treatise. His rules for student awards were incorporated into the Ratio Studiorum. In 1565 he made a revision of Soarez's De arte rhetorica. At the request of Francesco Adorno, he wrote De ratione liberorum instituendorum literis Graecis et Latinis (How to Teach Children Latin and Greek). Pepinyá disagreed strongly with the rhetorical innovations of Peter Ramus. Pepinyá died in Paris.

== Works ==
- Perpiña, Pedro Juan (1589). Petri Ioannis Perpiniani Valentini e. Societate: Iesu Orationes duodeuiginti (in Latin). Brixiae: apud Petrum Mariam Marchettum.
