= Cypriano de Soarez =

Spanish Jesuit humanist (1524-1593)

Cypriano Soarez y Herrera, S.J. (1524–1593) was a sixteenth-century Spanish Jesuit who wrote De Arte Rhetorica, the first Jesuit rhetoric textbook.

== Life ==
Soarez was born in Ocaña in the Kingdom of Toledo. His mother was Lady Francesca de Hererra and Soarez had converso heritage. He joined the Jesuit order in Portugal on September 21, 1549, with the support of Fray Luis de Granada. He taught rhetoric in Jesuit schools, including the College of Saint Anthony in Lisbon and the Royal College of Coimbra. In Coimbra, he also served as a cook, porter, and sweeper. Emmanuel Alvarez, who would later write the first Jesuit Latin grammar handbook (De institutio grammatica libri tres), also worked with Soarez. He attained the office of Prefect of Studies in the College of Arts. Later, he attained the degree of doctor of theology at the Jesuit College of Evora, and became rector in the College of Braga. In 1580, he moved to Castile. With Francisco Suarez, Soarez was appointed to the committee to offer feedback on the Society's developing Ratio studiorum. He later died in Placentia.

== Works ==
Concerned that young students in Jesuit colleges were not ready for major rhetorical texts such as Aristotle's Rhetoric, Cicero's De Oratore, and Quintilian's Institutio Oratoria, Soarez wrote De arte rhetorica as digest of their work as an introduction for students still learning Latin.

Soarez wrote the first draft of the work around 1562; it was revised by fellow Jesuit Pedro Juan Pepinyá in about 1565.

The De arte rhetorica (1568) was organized in Aristotelian form but borrowed its content heavily from Cicero. Soarez intended the De arte rhetorica as an introductory digest that would introduce students to the principles of rhetoric and oratory; though students had learned Latin grammar, he found that they were not guaranteed to have facility reading “Quintilian, Cicero, Virgil, Sallust, and the other authors." The De arte rhetorica went through more than 75 printings from 1460 to 1700. This included printings in Mexico City. The Jesuit Ratio Studiorum marked Soarez' De arte rhetorica the required rhetoric handbook in the second semester of the Humanities course for students at Jesuit colleges all over the world.

== Bibliography ==
- Flynn, Lawrence J., S.J. "The De Arte Rhetorica of Cyprian Soarez, S.J." Quarterly Journal of Speech, 42 (1956): 367–74. Print.
- Flynn, Lawrence J., S.J. "Sources and Influence of Soarez’ De Arte Rhetorica." Quarterly Journal of Speech, 43 (1957): 257–65. Print.
- Flynn, Lawrence J., S.J. The De Arte Rhetorica (1568) by Cyprian Soarez, S.J. A Translation with Introduction and Notes. Diss. University of Florida, 1955. Ann Arbor: UMI: 2001. Print.
