= Menander Rhetor =

3rd or 4th century Greek rhetorician and commentator

Menander Rhetor (Greek: Μένανδρος Ῥήτωρ), also known as Menander of Laodicea (Greek: Μένανδρος ὁ Λαοδικεύς), was a Greek rhetorician and commentator of the 3rd or 4th century AD.

Two incomplete treatises on epideictic speeches have been preserved under his name, but it is generally considered that they cannot be by the same author. Bursian attributes the first to Menander, whom he placed in the 4th century, and the second to an anonymous rhetorician of Alexandria Troas, who possibly lived in the time of Diocletian. Others, from the superscription of the Paris manuscript, assign the first to Genethlius of Petra in Palestine.

In view of the general tradition of antiquity, that both treatises were the work of Menander, it is possible that the author of the second was not identical with the Menander mentioned by the Suda; since the name is of frequent occurrence in later Greek literature. The first treatise, entitled Division of Epideictic Styles (Διαίρεσις τῶν Ἐπιδεικτικῶν), discusses the different kinds of epideictic speeches; the second, On Epideictic Speeches (Περὶ Ἐπιδεικτικῶν), has special titles for each chapter.

Text in L Spengel's Rhetores graeci, iii. 329-446, and in C Bursian's "Der Rhetor Menandros und seine Schriften" in Abhandlungen der bayerischen Akademie der Wissenschaften, xvi. (1882); see also Wilhelm Nitsche, Der Rhetor Menandros und die Scholien zu Demosthenes; JE Sandys, History of Classical Scholarship (1906), i. 338; Wilhelm von Christ, Geschichte der griechischen Litteratur (1898), 550.

== See also ==
- Byzantine rhetoric
