= Omer Talon =

French humanist

Omer Talon (Audomarus Talaeus) (c. 1510–1562) was a French humanist, a close ally of Petrus Ramus. Biographical details are few; and there are some quite serious bibliographical difficulties in distinguishing Talon and Ramus as authors (prolific and given to teamwork).

== Life ==
He was from Vermandois, the same region as Ramus. According to the Biographie universelle of Michaud, he had a teaching position in rhetoric in 1534, at the Collège du cardinal Lemoine in Paris.

== Works ==
In 1543 Ramus in his Institutiones dialecticae announced that Talon would produce a rhetoric introduction to match this introduction to logic. Talon's Institutiones oratoriae was then published in 1544 or 1545, and proved popular. It was hardly independent of Ramism (the system of ideas developed by Ramus), however. It was reprinted in the 1557 Rhétorique française of Antoine Foquelin. There are sources that make Ramus the author of the 1545 work, with Talon then writing the 1548 Rhetorica.
