= Julius Rufinianus =

Iulius Rufinianus was a Latin rhetor who lived in the 4th century AD. He wrote a book entitled De figuris sententiarum et elocutionis. Perhaps he is the author of two other treatises: De schematis lexeos and De schematis dianoeas.
