= Juan Lorenzo Palmireno =

Spanish rhetorician (1524–1579)

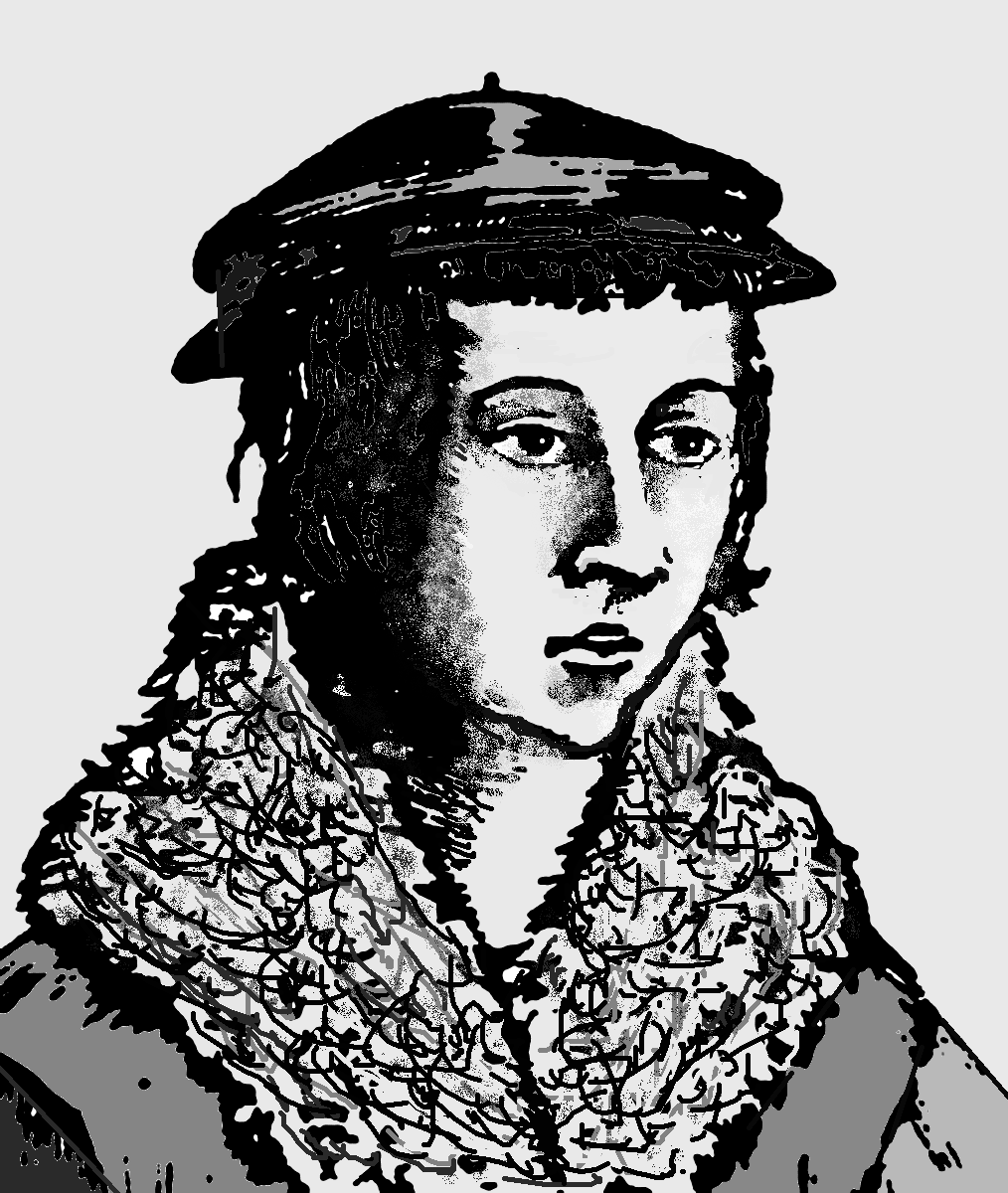
- Born: 1524; Valencia
- Died: 1579 (aged 54–55)

Education
- Education: University of Valencia

Philosophical work
- School: Renaissance humanism
- Institutions: University of Valencia
- Main interests: Rhetoric Latin
- Notable works: Rhetoricae Laurentii Palmireni

Juan Lorenzo Palmireno (Latin: Joannes Laurentius Palmireno; 1524–1579) was an Aragonese humanist, playwright and educator. Philip II of Spain called him the most learned man in his kingdom.

== Biography ==
Juan Lorenzo Palmireno was born in Alcañiz. Professor of Rhetoric and Greek at the University of Zaragoza from 1556 to 1560, he was appointed Professor at the University of Valencia in 1560. He also graduated in medicine from Valencia. In 1570 he returned to his village home, organizing grammar classes there. From 1572 until his death in 1579 he was again Professor at Valencia.

== Works ==
- Aphtonii Clarissimi Rhetoris Progymnasmata (1552)
- De vera et facili imitatione Ciceronis (Zaragoza,1560)
- Enchiridion Graecae Linguae (Lyon, 1558; Valencia, Mey, 1561)
- De copia rerum et artificio rhetorico libellus (Valencia, Juan Mey, 1564)
- Rhetorica prolegomena (Valencia, Juan Mey,1564)
- Rhetoricae. Pars secunda in duos libros distributa (Valencia, 1565)
- Tertia et ultima pars Rhetoricae Laurentii Palmireni (Valencia, Juan Mey, 1566)
- Prima pars rhetoricae (Valencia, Juan Mey, 1567)
- El Estudioso de Aldea (1568)
- Nebrija, Antonio de. Libro IV Introducciones latinae (Valencia, Pedro de Huete, 1571)
- De arte dicendi libri quinque (Valencia, 1573)
- Descuidos de los latinos interpretando los comentarios de César (Valencia, 1573)
- El latino de repente (Valencia, Pedro de Huete, 1573) (contains Eloquentia iuvenilis y De vera et facili)
- Rhetoricae Laurentii Palmireni liber quartus, in quo de inventione partium orationis disputatur (Valencia, Pedro de Huete, 1573)
- Vocabulario del humanista (Valencia, Pedro de Huete,1573)
- Phrases Ciceronis obscuriores in Hispanicam linguam conversae... Eiusdem Oratio post reditum in Academia Valentina (Valencia, Pedro de Huete, 1574)
- Campi eloquentiae in quibus... ratio declamandi, orationes, praefationes, epistolae... continentur (Valencia, Pedro de Huete, 1574)
- Eloquentia iuvenilis (Valencia, 1578)
- El Estudioso cortesano (Valencia, Pedro de Huete, 1578)
- Rhetoricae Laurentii Palmireni liber tertius et ultimus, in quo de inventione, copia rerum, dispositione, memoria et actione disputatur (Valencia, Pedro de Huete, 1578)
- Dilucida conscribendi epistolas ratio (Valencia, 1585)
