= George of Trebizond =

Byzantine Greek philosopher, scholar and humanist

- Γεώργιος Τραπεζούντιος
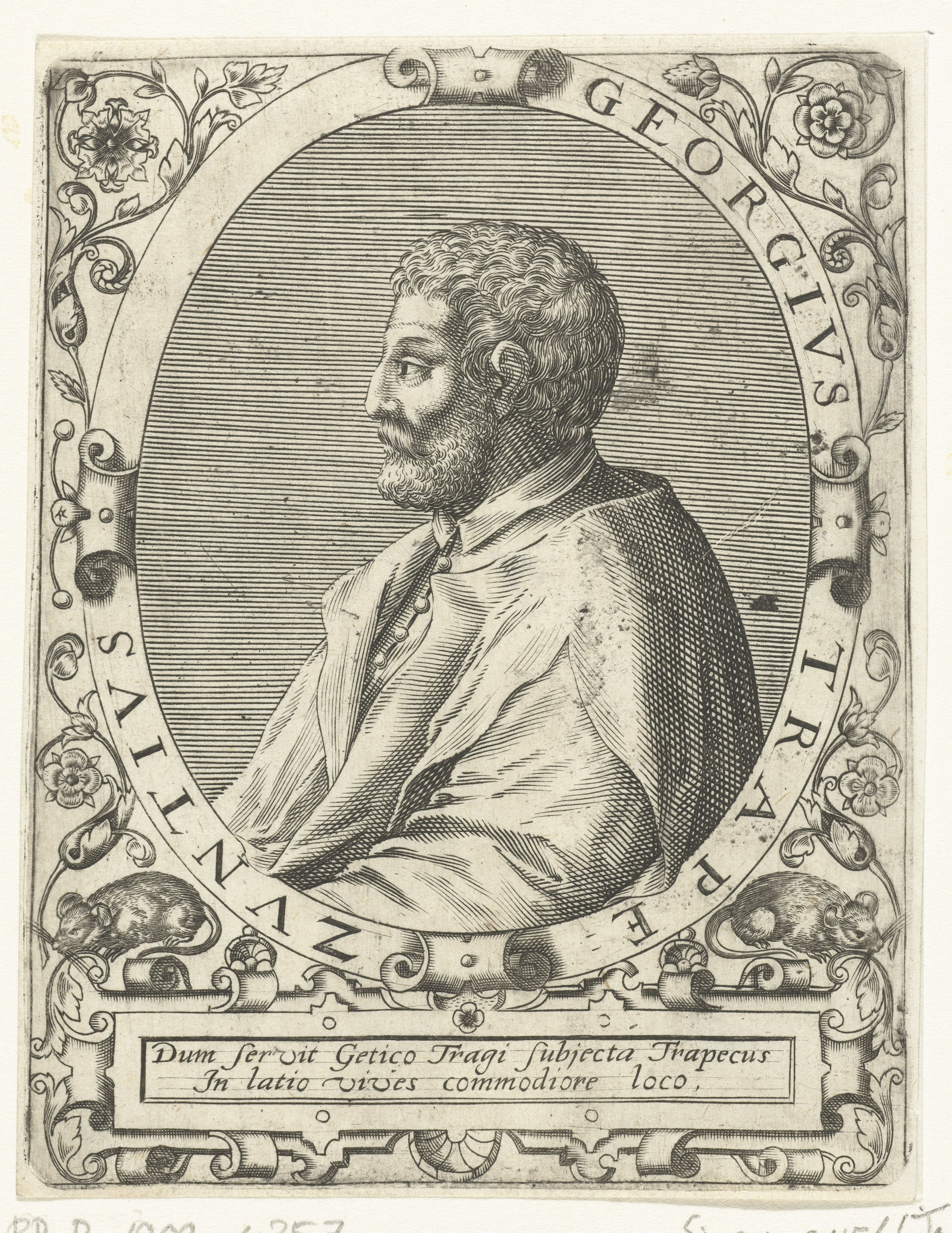
- Portrait of George of Trebizond by Johann Theodor de Bry
- Born: 1395; Crete, Kingdom of Candia
- Died: 1486 (aged 90–91); Rome, Papal States

George of Trebizond (Greek: Γεώργιος Τραπεζούντιος; 1395–1486) was a Byzantine Greek philosopher, scholar, and humanist.

== Life ==
He was born on the Greek island of Crete (then a Venetian colony known as the Kingdom of Candia), and derived his surname Trapezuntius (Τραπεζούντιος) from the fact that his ancestors were from the Byzantine Greek Trapezuntine Empire.

When he went to Italy is not certain; according to some accounts he was summoned to Venice about 1430 to act as amanuensis to Francesco Barbaro, who appears to have already made his acquaintance; according to others he did not visit Italy until the time of the Council of Florence (1438–1439).

He learned Latin from Vittorino da Feltre, and made such rapid progress that in three years he was able to teach Latin literature and rhetoric. His reputation as a teacher and a translator of Aristotle was very great, and he was selected as secretary by Pope Nicholas V, an ardent Aristotelian. The bitterness of his attacks upon Plato (in the Comparatio Aristotelis et Platonis of 1458, described by historian James Hankins as "one of the most remarkable mixtures of learning and lunacy ever penned"), which drew forth a powerful response from Bessarion (In calumniatorem Platonis, printed in 1469) and the manifestly hurried and inaccurate character of his translations of Plato, Aristotle and other classical authors, combined to ruin his fame as a scholar, and to endanger his position as a teacher of philosophy. (Pope Pius II was among the critics of George's translations.) The indignation against George on account of his first-named work was so great that he would probably have been compelled to leave Italy had not Alfonso V of Aragon given him protection at the court of Naples.

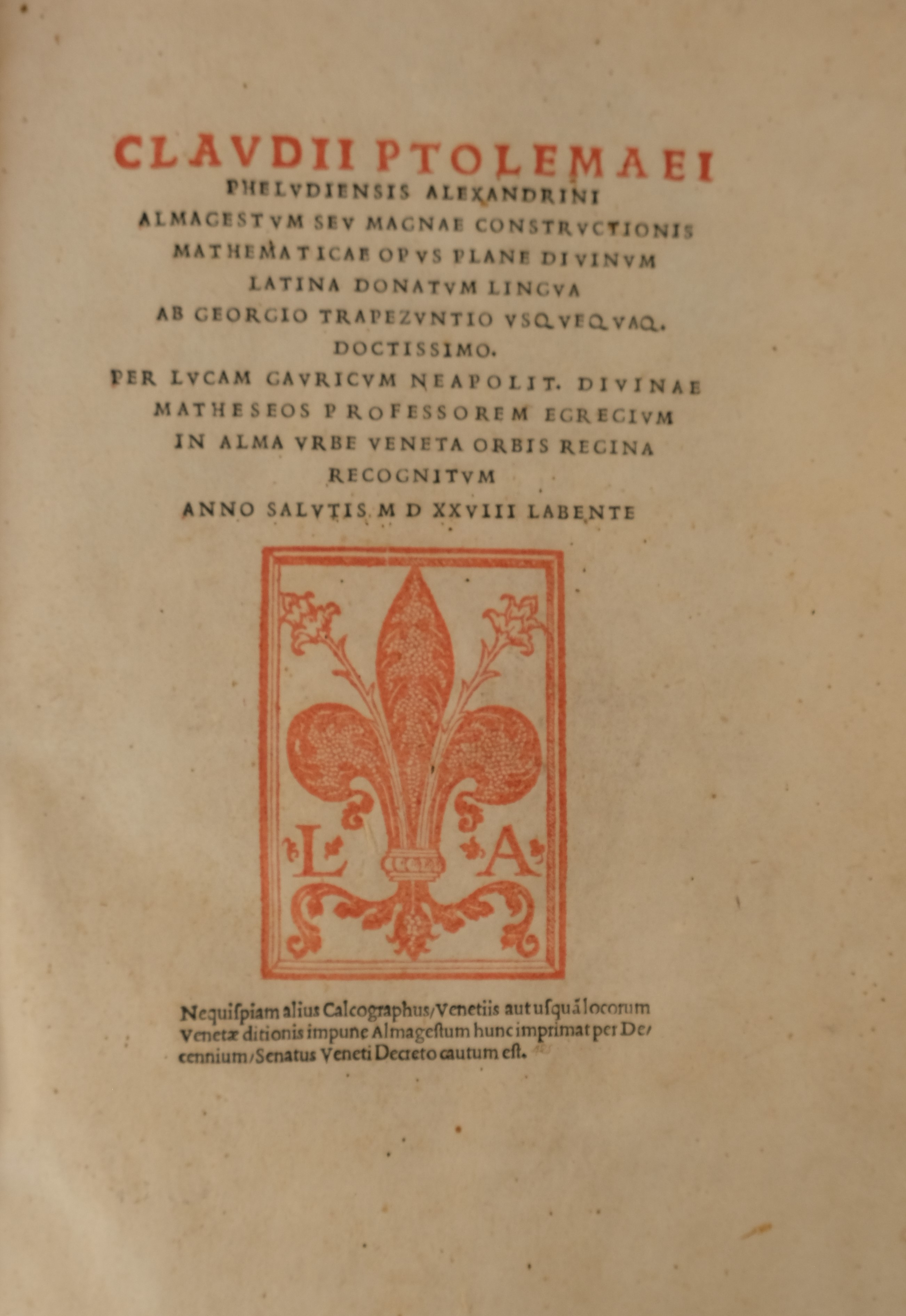
Title page from a 1528 copy of Ptolemy's "Almagestum," translated to Latin from Greek by Trebizond

He subsequently returned to Rome, where in 1471 he published a very successful Latin grammar based on the work of another Greek grammarian of Latin, Priscian. Additionally, an earlier work on Greek rhetorical principles garnered him wide recognition, even from his former critics who admitted his brilliance and scholarship. He died in great poverty in 1486 in Rome.

His son, Andrea of Trebizond (da Trebisonda) was also a classic scholar and translator in Rome.

== Works ==
- Rhetoricorum libri V. A synthesis of the Rhetorica ad Herennium and the Hermogenean corpus.
- Isagoge dialectica.
- De artificio Ciceronianae orationis pro Quinto Ligario.
- Rhetoricorum. A translation of Aristotle's Rhetoric.

For a complete list of his numerous works, consisting of translations from Greek into Latin (Plato, Aristotle and the Fathers) and original essays in Greek (chiefly theological) and Latin (grammatical and rhetorical), see Fabricius, Bibliotheca Graeca (ed. Harles), xii.

Two works of his have been translated into English: Protectio Aristotelis Problematum (The Protection of Aristotle’s Problemata) and Comparatio Philosophorum Platonis et Aristotelis (A Comparison of the Philosophers Plato and Aristotle). These can both be found in Vindicatio Aristotelis.

== See also ==
- Byzantine scholars in the Renaissance
