= Louis of Granada =

Dominican theologian (1504–1588)

Venerable Luis of Granada OP
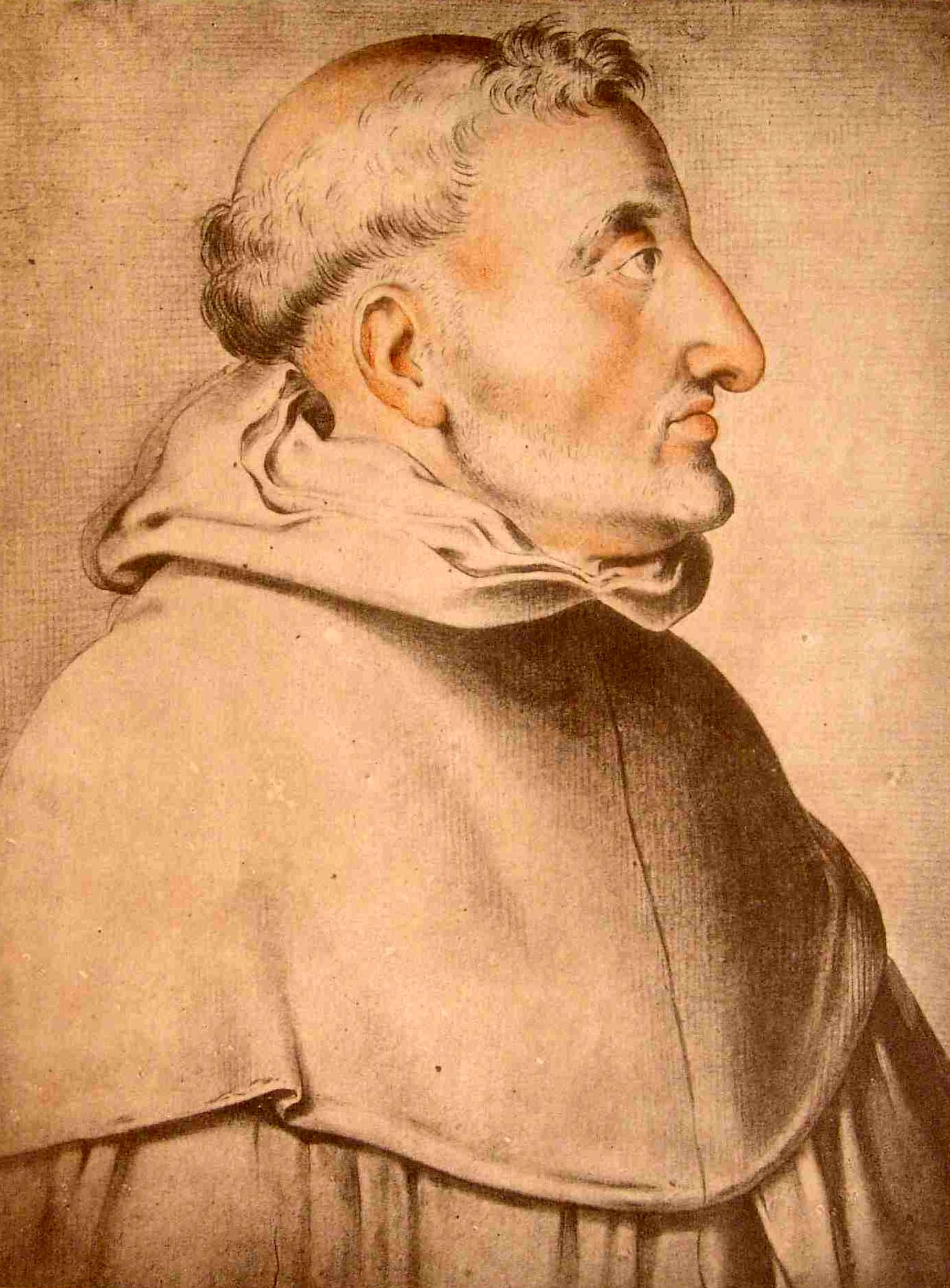
- Born: Luís Sarria; 1504; Granada, Spain
- Died: 31 December 1588 (aged 84); Lisbon, Portugal

Education
- Education: University of Valladolid

Philosophical work
- Era: humanism
- Region: Spain

Louis of Granada (also Luis of Granada; 1504 – 31 December 1588) was a Spanish Dominican friar, theologian, writer and preacher. His beatification process has been long open with the Holy See, with his current status being venerable.

== Biography ==
Luis was born in Granada of poor parents named Sarria. At the age of nineteen he was received into the Dominican Order in the Priory of the Holy Cross in Granada. His philosophical studies once over, he was chosen by his superiors to represent his community at the Colegio de San Gregorio at Valladolid, an institution of the Dominican Order reserved for extraordinary students.

When Luis had completed these studies, he embarked upon the career of a preacher, in which he continued with extraordinary success during forty years. The fame of his preaching spread beyond the boundaries of his native land, and at the request of Henrique of Portugal, son of King Manuel, he was transferred to Portugal, where he became Prior Provincial of the Portuguese Dominicans in 1557. His extraordinary sanctity, learning, and wisdom soon attracted the attention of the queen regent, who appointed him her confessor and counselor. The Bishopric of Viseu and the Archbishopric of Braga were successively offered to him only to be courteously, but firmly, refused. The honours of the cardinalate, offered to him by Pope Sixtus V, were also declined.

His published works treat various topics in Scripture, dogma, ethics, biography and church history. He is best known, however, for his writings in ascetical theology, most of which have been translated into a variety of other languages. The best known of these is The Sinner's Guide (La Guía de Pecadores), published in 1555. It is marked by a smooth, harmonious Spanish idiom which has earned it the reputation of a classic, and by an eloquence that has made it a perennial source of religious inspiration. It has been compared with Thomas à Kempis's The Imitation of Christ. Fairly soon after its first appearance it was translated into Italian, Latin, French, German, Polish, and Greek.

In 1539, at the age of 35, he wrote a small tract on the method of prayer for a student who had written to him for advice. This tract developed into his first book, The Book of Prayer and Meditation, published in 1554. The unexpected success of the book led him to dedicate himself to writing on spiritual themes for all. He led a life of an ascetic, his cell being poor and having few possessions. He wrote for 35 years, producing 49 works. All money that he earned from his writings went to the poor.

Luis died at the age of 84 at Lisbon, Portugal.

== Works ==
Luis de Granada produced in total 45 works, in Spanish, Latin and Portuguese, comprising original works, as well as translations of others' works and revisions and additions to his own previously published works. Among the works authored by him are:

- Libro de la Oracion y Meditacion (The Book of Prayer and Meditation), (Salamanca: Andrés de Portonariis, 1554; revised, 1566)
- Memorial de la Vida Cristiana (A Memorial of a Christian life), 2 vols, (Lisbon, 1565)
- Guía de pecadores (The Sinner's Guide), 2 vols, (Lisbon, 1556, 1557) – available as HTML version or archive.org version
- Introducción del símbolo de la fe, (Salamanca, 1584)
- Vida de Jesucristo: para conocer, amar e imitar a nuestro Señor
- Vida de María: vida y misterio de la Santísima Virgen
- Los seis libros de la Retórica Eclesiástica o Método de Predicar
- Adiciones al Memorial de la Vida Cristiana
- Compendio y Explicacion de la Doctrina Cristiana
- Oracion al Glorioso Patriarca Sancto Domingo
- Vida de fray Bartolome de los Martires
- Trece sermones

A collected edition of his works was published in 9 volumes at Antwerp in 1578.

== Later reputation ==
A biography was written by L. Munoz, La Vida y virtudes de Luis de Granada (Madrid, 1639).

Rose of Lima's favorite book by Luis was The Book of Prayer and Meditation—a book that laments the miseries of life and manifests spiritual contempt for the world. Once, it was said, she banished the devil's temptations by reading this book, causing the devil to snatch the book from her and throw it onto a rubbish heap. Rose remained calm, certain that the Lord would return it to her, and she got it back.

Other famous Catholics who have read and loved the works of Louis of Granada include Vincent de Paul, Louise de Marillac, Francis de Sales, Cardinal Berulle and Jacques-Bénigne Bossuet (all French); Charles Borromeo (Italian), Louis of Leon (Spanish), and the Jesuit and Barnabite Orders. Teresa of Ávila read his books and commanded her nuns to do so.

Francis de Sales highly commended to a bishop-elect to have the whole works of Louis of Granada, and to regard them as a second breviary. He advised him to read them carefully, beginning with The Sinner's Guide. He said, "But to read him with fruit you must not run through him hastily; he must be pondered, and have his full weight, and chapter after chapter must be mused upon and applied to the soul with much thought and prayer to God. You must read him with reverence and devotion, like a book containing the most useful inspirations man can receive from on high, and thereby reform all the powers of the soul."
