= Accurso =

Italian surname

Accurso is an Italian surname originating from a medieval given name meaning "help" or "assistance". Accorso is a variant of the name. Notable people with the surname include:

- Mariangelo Accorso (1489/90–1544/46), Italian writer and critic
- Rachel Accurso (born 1982), American YouTuber
- Tony Accurso (born 1951), Canadian businessman

== See also ==
- Accursius (disambiguation)
