= Pseudo-Gregory =

Pseudo-Gregory is conventional name for any author of a pseudepigraphon (falsely attributed work) found under the name of a famous Gregory. These may be deliberate falsifications (forgeries) or simply misattributions. Examples include:

- Testimonies Against the Jews, a 4th- or 5th-century text written in the name of Gregory of Nyssa
- Dialogues, traditionally attributed to Gregory the Great in 593–594, but its authenticity has been questioned
- Disclosure of the Divine Liturgy, a 12th-century work attributed to Gregory of Nazianzus
- On the Four Parts of a Perfect Speech, an anonymous 13th-century treatise on letter- and speech-writing misattributed to Gregory of Corinth
