= Belarusian Council of Orthodox Churches in North America =

Churches in North America

The Belarusian Council of Orthodox Churches in North America was a group of five parishes in the United States and Canada under the jurisdiction of the Ecumenical Patriarchate of Constantinople.

The group was created in 1970. They did not have their own bishop, but were rather administered by Metropolitan Nicholas of Amissos of the American Carpatho-Russian Orthodox Diocese (EP), who then reported to the primate of the Greek Orthodox Archdiocese of America. After several years under the Ecumenical Patriarchate the parishes returned to the Belarusian Autocephalous Orthodox Church.
