= Gregory Tatsis =

His Eminence Gregory
- Metropolitan of Nyssa, Primate of the American Carpatho-Russian Orthodox Diocese
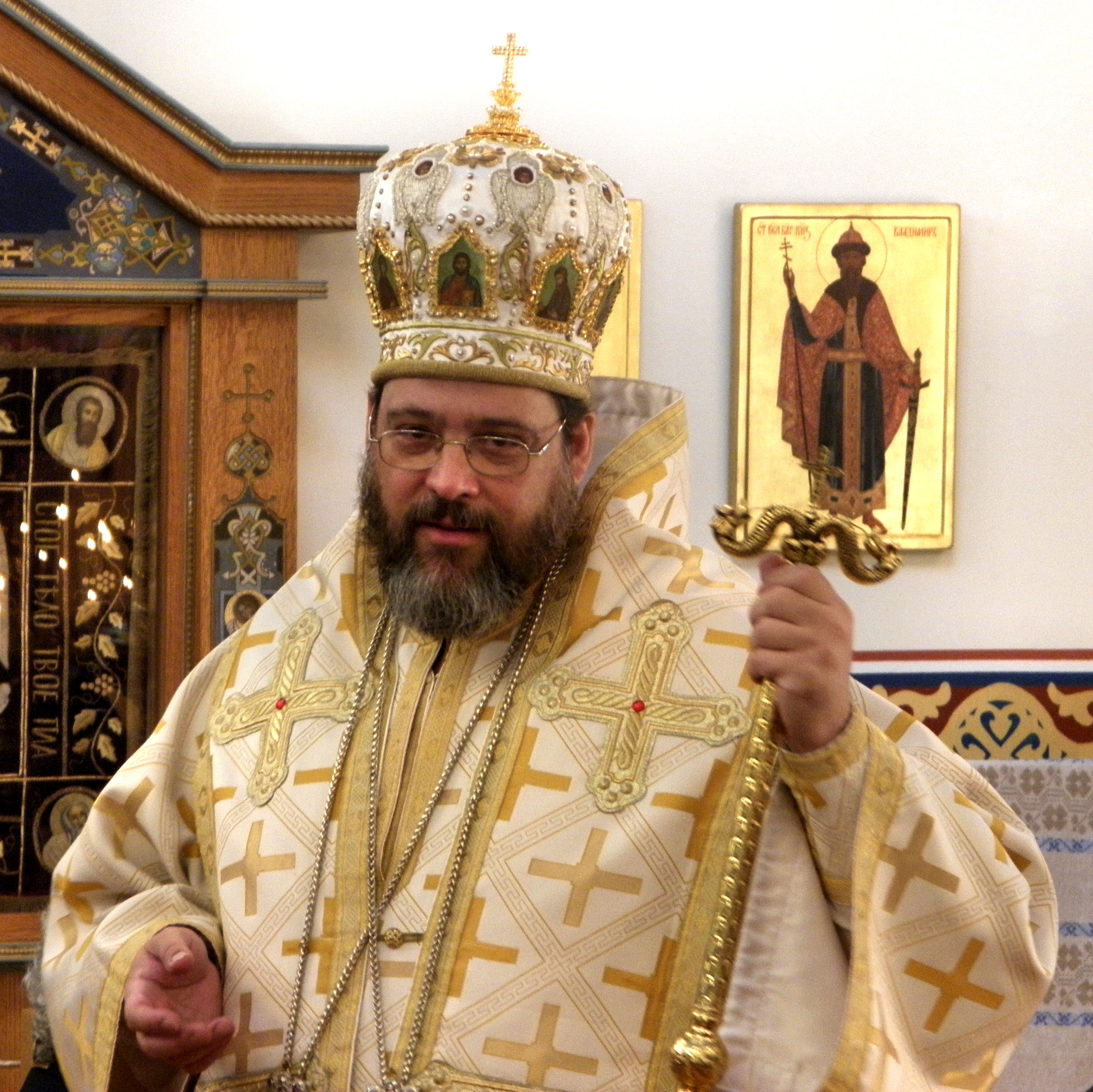
- Gregory in 2013
- Church: Ecumenical Patriarchate of Constantinople
- Metropolis: American Carpatho-Russian Orthodox Diocese
- See: Nyssa (Titular)
- Elected: 30 August 2012
- Installed: 27 November 2012
- Predecessor: Nicholas (Smisko)

Orders
- Ordination: 28 January 2007 by Alexios (Panagiotopoulos)
- Consecration: 27 November 2012 by Demetrios (Trakatellis)

Personal details
- Born: George Tatsis; 7 December 1958 (age 67) Charlotte, North Carolina, US
- Denomination: Eastern Orthodox Christianity
- Education: University of North Carolina; Holy Cross Greek Orthodox School of Theology

Metropolitan Gregory (Secular name: George Tatsis) (b. 7 December 1958) is the primate of the American Carpatho-Russian Orthodox Diocese under the Ecumenical Patriarchate of Constantinople since 2012. His full title is: His Eminence Gregory, Metropolitan of Nyssa and Primate of the American Carpatho-Russian Orthodox Diocese.

Gregory was nominated as successor to Metropolitan Nicholas (Smisko) by the Clergy of the American Carpatho-Russian Orthodox Diocese (ACROD) at a Special Assembly on July 13, 2012.

He was elected Bishop of Nyssa and Primate of the ACROD by the Holy Synod of the Ecumenical Patriarchate of Constantinople on August 30, 2012. In 27 November 2012 he was consecrated to episcopacy by Archbishop Demetrios (Trakatellis) an other american hierarchs in Christ the Saviour Cathedral in Johnstown, Pennsylvania.
