= Epectasy =

Epectasy (Greek: ἐπέκτασις) is a Christian term used by Gregory of Nyssa to describe the soul's eternal movement into God's infinite being.
