= St Nicholas Carpatho-Rusyn church =

St. Nicholas Orthodox Church
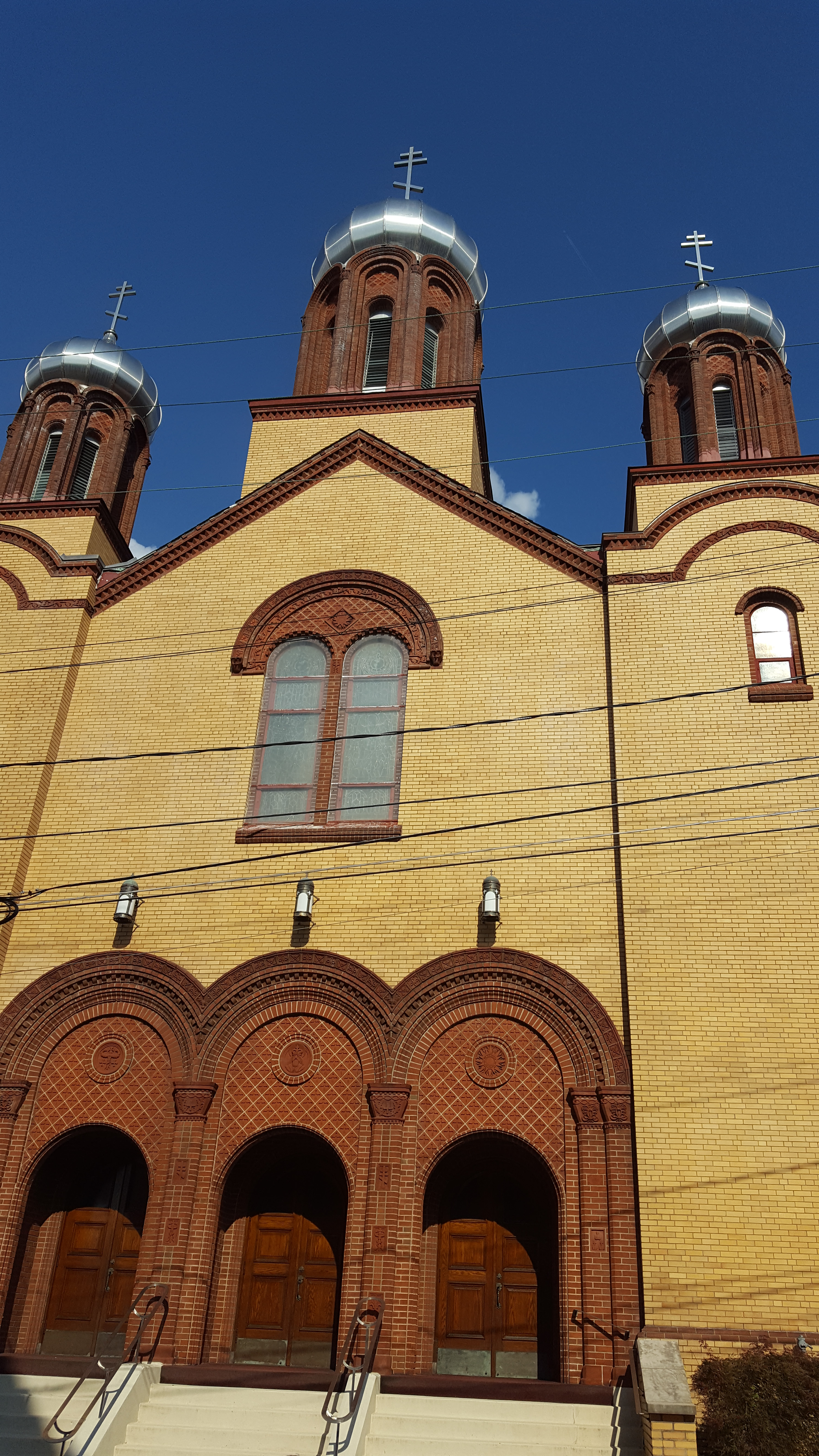

- Location within Pennsylvania Location within the United States
- 40.407093°N 79.91048°W
- Location: 903 Ann St., Homestead, Pennsylvania
- Country: United States
- Denomination: Russian Orthodox
- Website: www.stnichomestead.org

History
- Founded: 1936

Architecture
- Groundbreaking: 1936
- Completed: 1958

Administration
- Diocese: American Carpatho-Russian Orthodox Diocese

Clergy
- Bishop: Bishop Gregory (Tatsis) of Nyssa
- Rector: R. Michael Zak

St. Nicholas Orthodox Church, also known as St. Nicholas Carpatho-Russian Orthodox Church, is a historic Russian Orthodox church at 903 Ann Street in Homestead, Pennsylvania. It was built between 1936 and 1958. The church serves the local Rusyn community. It is a member of the American Carpatho-Russian Orthodox Diocese. The church's stainless steel domes were built using steel from local mills.

== History ==
On March 15, 1936, Mr. John Pido, on behalf of his mother, Mrs. Anna Pido, Mr. Grucelak and Mr. Herack put up $1,000 each to secure property which would become the future church site. The estate of the late Nettie D. Stroud was located on the corner of 9th Avenue and Ann Street, and this site was chosen. The site part of the estate of the late Nettie D. Stroud.

On November 16, 1936 a service was held and the ground was broken for the new Church. In the traditions of the Church, ground was broken by Father Molchany and Mr. Andrew Banyas. After this a steam shovel on 9th Avenue owned by the McCrady-Rodgers Construction Company under the direction of the general Contractor, William B. Hartley Construction Company, removed several more shovels of earth to symbolically begin the excavation of the Church. To save on the cost of construction, parishioners helped to pour some of the concrete and worked at other small jobs.

In January 1937, the Church was ecclesiastically organized, and Mr. John M. Romanchuk was chosen as the first president of the newly recognized parish. On November 19, 1937, a charter was issued to the parish. The first Divine Liturgy was held at the church location on February 26, 1938.

The Great Depression and World War 2 slowed progress. The stainless steel used in the domes came from the Homestead Mill.

Finally on Sunday, July 2, 1950 Bishop Orestes Chornock led a procession around the newly completed Church. Bishop Orestes blessed and sanctified the building and the grounds.

Michael Puchy served as church president from 1941 to 1971.

Several Rusyn churches were established in and around Homestead. St Nicholas was the last one to be built.

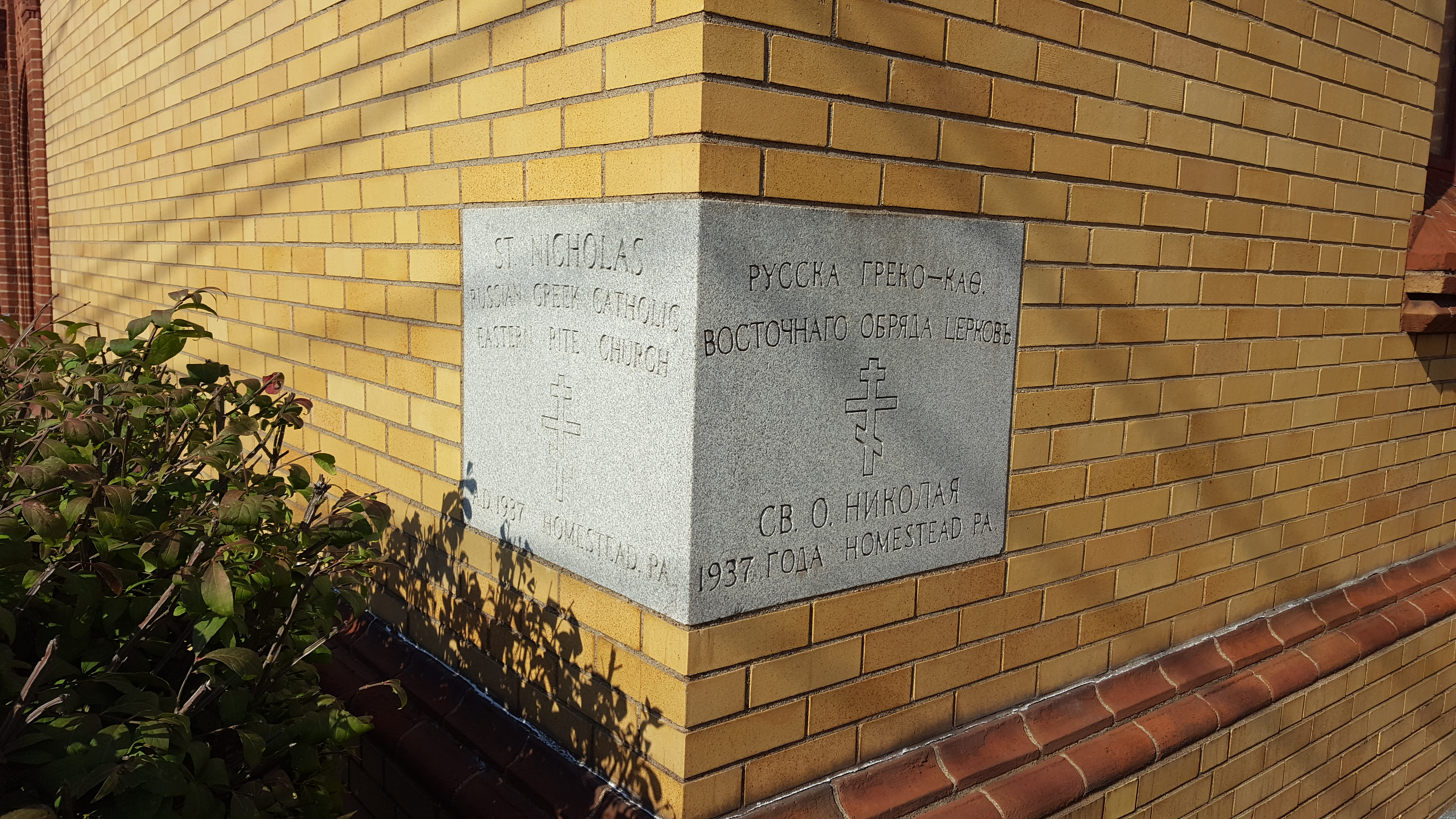
St Nicholas Carpatho-Rusyn church corner
