= Bonaccorso =

Bonaccorso may refer to:

- Bonaccorso da Pisa (15th century), Italian humanist, editor and publisher
- Lelio Bonaccorso (born 1982), Italian comic artist and illustrator
