= Adversus Judaeos =

Series of homilies by John Chrysostom

Adversus Judaeos (Ancient Greek: Κατὰ Ἰουδαίων Kata Ioudaiōn, "against the Jews") is a series of fourth-century homilies by Saint John Chrysostom directed to members of the church of Antioch of his time, who continued to observe Jewish feasts and fasts. Critical of this, he cast Judaism and the synagogues in his city in a critical and negative light.

== Purpose and context ==
During his first two years as a presbyter in Antioch (386-387), Chrysostom denounced Jews and Judaizing Christians in a series of eight sermons delivered to pagans in the church of Antioch, who were taking part in Jewish festivals and other Jewish observances. It is disputed whether the main target were specifically Judaizers or Jews in general. His homilies were expressed in the conventional manner, utilizing the uncompromising rhetorical form known as the psogos (Greek: blame).

One of the purposes of these homilies was to prevent Christians from participating in Jewish customs, and thus prevent the perceived erosion of Chrysostom's flock. In his sermons, Chrysostom criticized those "Judaizing Christians", who were participating in Jewish festivals and taking part in other Jewish observances, such as observing the sabbath, submitting to circumcision and pilgrimage to Jewish holy places.

In Greek, the sermons are called Kata Ioudaiōn (Κατὰ Ἰουδαίων), which is translated as Adversus Judaeos in Latin and Against the Jews in English. The most recent scholarly translations, claiming that Chrysostom's primary targets were members of his own congregation who continued to observe the Jewish feasts and fasts, give the sermons the more sympathetic title Against Judaizing Christians.

== Antisemitism ==
Chrysostom claimed that on the Sabbath and Jewish festivals synagogues were full of Christians, especially women, who loved the solemnity of the Jewish liturgy, enjoyed listening to the shofar on Rosh Hashanah, and applauded famous preachers in accordance with the contemporary custom. A more recent apologetic theory is that he instead tried to persuade Jewish Christians, who for centuries had kept connections with Jews and Judaism, to choose between Judaism and Christianity.

Chrysostom held Jews responsible for the crucifixion of Jesus and deicide (killing God, see "Jewish deicide" for the subject). He compared the synagogue to a pagan temple, representing it as the source of all vices and heresies. He described it as a place worse than a brothel and a drinking shop; it was a den of scoundrels, the repair of wild beasts, a temple of demons, the refuge of brigands and debauchees, and the cavern of devils, a criminal assembly of the assassins of Christ. Palladius, Chrysostom's contemporary biographer, also recorded his claim that among the Jews the priesthood may be purchased and sold for money. Finally, he declared that, in accordance with the sentiments of the saints, he hated both the synagogue and the Jews, saying that demons dwell in the synagogue and also in the souls of the Jews, and describing them as growing fit for slaughter.

Since there were only two other ordained individuals in Antioch who were legally recognized as able to preach Christianity, Chrysostom was able to reach most of the local Christians, especially with his skills in the art of orating. He held great social and political power in Antioch, and frequently spoke about acts of violence taking place in Jewish areas to dissuade Christians from going there.

== Historical recuperation ==
The original Benedictine editor of the homilies, Bernard de Montfaucon, gives the following footnote to the title: "A discourse against the Jews; but it was delivered against those who were Judaizing and keeping the fasts with them [the Jews]." As such, some have claimed that the original title misrepresents the contents of the discourses, which show that Chrysostom's primary targets were members of his own congregation who continued to observe the Jewish feasts and fasts. Sir Henry Savile, in his 1612 edition of Homilies 27 of Volume 6 (which is Discourse I in Patrologia Graeca's Adversus Iudaeos), gives the title: "Chrysostom's Discourse Against Those Who Are Judaizing and Observing Their Fasts."

The sermons became known to the West in the seventeenth century, when the whole corpus of Chrysostom was first printed. British historian Paul Johnson stated that Chrysostom's homilies "became the pattern for anti-Jewish tirades, making the fullest possible use (and misuse) of key passages in the gospels of Saints Matthew and John. Thus a specifically Christian antisemitism, presenting the Jews as murderers of Christ, was grafted on to the seething mass of pagan smears and rumours, and Jewish communities were now at risk in every Christian city." According to historian William I. Brustein, his sermons against Jews gave further momentum to the idea that the Jews are collectively responsible for the death of Jesus. Anglican priest James Parkes called the writing on Jews "the most horrible and violent denunciations of Judaism to be found in the writings of a Christian theologian".

According to Patristics scholars, opposition to any particular view during the late fourth century was conventionally expressed in a manner, utilizing the rhetorical form known as the psogos, whose literary conventions were to vilify opponents in an uncompromising manner; thus, it has been argued that to call Chrysostom an "anti-Semite" is to employ anachronistic terminology in a way incongruous with historical context and record.

== Chrysostom's homilies and Nazism ==
There are modern scholars who claim that an abuse of his preaching, which became well known to the West in the seventeenth century, fed Christian antisemitism, and some, such as Stephen Katz, go even further, saying it was an inspiration for pagan Nazi antisemitism. Indeed, during World War II, the Nazi Party in Germany abused his homilies, quoting and reprinting them frequently in an attempt to legitimize the Holocaust in the eyes of German and Austrian Christians.

Some authors say John Chrysostom's preaching was an inspiration for Nazi antisemitism with its evil fruit of the programme to annihilate the Jewish race. Steven Katz cites Chrysostom's homilies as “the decisive turn in the history of Christian anti-Judaism, a turn whose ultimate disfiguring consequence was enacted in the political antisemitism of Adolf Hitler.” During World War II, the Nazi Party in Germany used Chrysostom's work in an attempt to legitimize the Holocaust in the eyes of German and Austrian Christians. His works were frequently quoted and reprinted as a witness for the prosecution. After World War II, the Christian Churches denounced Nazi use of Chrysostom's works, explaining his words with reference to the historical context. According to Walter Laqueur, it was argued that in the 4th century, the general discourse was brutal and aggressive and that at the time when the Christian church was fighting for survival and recognition, mercy and forgiveness were not in demand.

== Other Adversus Iudaeos literature ==
Other documents also form part of the Adversus Iudaeos literature. These include Tertullian or Pseudo-Tertullian's own Adversus Iudaeos, Pseudo-Gregory of Nyssa's Testimonies Against The Jews, and the Adversus Iudaeos texts in the literature of medieval Russia. Schreckenberg sees in the popular antisemitic references, such as anti-usurer poetry by the Rhineland poet Muskatblut, an extension of Adversus Iudaeos texts, though there is no evidence that Chrysostom’s sermons about the Jews had yet been translated. Even Eusebius's Demonstratio against paganism.

Samuel Krauss, Jean Juster and later Marcel Simon argued that the Adversus Iudaeos literature is a form of continuation of earlier Jewish-Christian encounters, specifically until the reign of Julian in 361, though other writers see the documents as more about strengthening Christian self-identity.
