= Accursius (name) =

Accursius was a Roman jurist.

Accursius may also refer to:

- Franciscus Accursius (1225–1293), Italian lawyer, son of Accursius
- Bonus Accursius (fl. 1456–1480), Italian scholar and printer
- Mariangelo Accorso (Latin: Mariangelus Accursius) (1489 or 1490–1544 or 1546), Italian humanist and scholar
- Accursius (died 1220), saint and companion in martyrdom to Berard of Carbio
