= Johann and Wendelin of Speyer =

15th-century German printers in Venice

The brothers Johann and Wendelin of Speyer (also known as de Speier and by their Italian names of Giovanni and Vindelino da Spira) were German printers in Venice from 1468 to 1477.

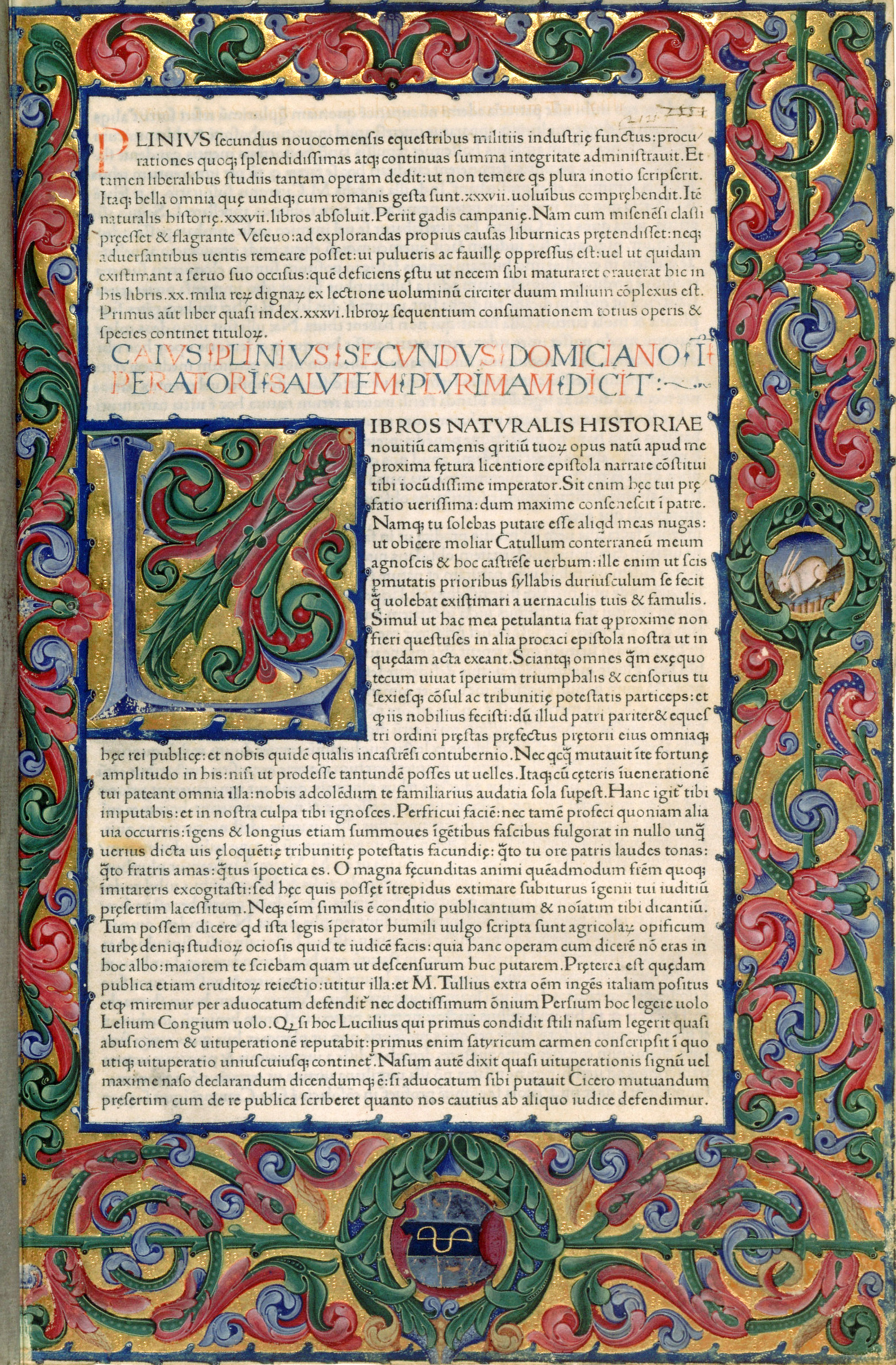
First page from the editio princeps of the Naturalis historia, printed in 1469 in Venice by Johann of Speyer. Bibliothèque nationale de France

They were among the first of those who came to Italy from Mainz, after 1462, to introduce printing. Knowledge of their lives is scanty. They came originally from Speyer. Early on, from 1460 to 1461, Johann appears in Mainz as a goldsmith. In 1468, with his wife, children, and brother Wendelin, he set out for Italy, settling in Venice.

== First books ==
The Venetian Senate extended a cordial welcome to Johann, and granted him a monopoly of printing for five years. He began in 1469 with an edition of a hundred copies of Cicero's Epistolae ad familiares, of 125 leaves. Before Johann died, he and Wendelin issued four great works: two editions of Cicero; the editio princeps of Pliny the Elder's Naturalis historia (1469); and the second printed edition of Livy's Ab Urbe condita libri (1470). Within seven months eight hundred volumes had been printed. During the printing of Augustine's De civitate Dei (1470) Johann died of the plague, and Wendelin completed it, assuming control of the business until 1477. In around 1472, he went into business with the German printer Johann von Köln.

== Series ==
From 1470 to 1477 Wendelin issued over seventy major works (Italian and Roman classics, Fathers of the Church, jurists, etc.). According to Heinrich Wallau Johann printed in an antique type modeled after the best Italian manuscript writing. Encyclopedia Britannica confirms that they used a clear and easily legible typeface.

== Type faces ==
In addition to this first type, Wendelin used five newly cut types of exquisite workmanship, among them three slender Gothic models, probably reduced to save space. His work showed the same correctness of text, beauty of printing, and evenness that had characterized Johann's. The latter was the first printer to number the leaves with Arabic numerals, and was also the first who used the colon and interrogation point. In Wendelin's books appeared for the first time the so-called catch-words (Kustoden), that is to say he printed on the lower margin of each page the first word of the page following.

The Speyer brothers are sometimes credited as the originators of the Roman type of character of movable type, other contenders being Pannartz and Sweynheim and Nicholas Jenson.

== Sources ==
- Wallau, Heinrich Wilhelm. "Johann and Wendelin von Speyer". Catholic Encyclopedia.
  - Denis, Suffragium pro J. de Spira (Vienna, 1794)
  - Brown, Venetian Printing Press (London, 1891)
  - Ongania, Art de l'imprimerie a Venise (Venice, 1895-6)
  - Hartwig et al., Festschrift zum 500 jahr. Geburstage von Johann Gutenberg (Mainz, 1900), 342.
- Example of Wendelin of Speyer printing
