= Johannes Crastonis =

Italian renaissance scholar and Carmelite

Johannes Crastonis (Crastonus; Crastone) was an Italian renaissance humanist and scholar. Crastonus was probably born in Castel San Giovanni close to Piacenza. He was a member of the Carmelites. He studied in Constantinople but migrated to Modena (near Ferrara) in Italy. There he published a Greek-Latin dictionary about 1480.

In Milan, together with Bonus Accursius, he edited various works to facilitate the learning of Greek. His collaboration with Bonus Accursius started no later than 1478. Among these works were a bi-lingual Greek and Latin edition of the Psalms, dedicated to Ludovico Donà, published on 21 September 1481. This was the first printed version of the Greek Psalms. While at Milan, he was friends with Ermolao Barbaro, Francesco Filelfo, Giorgio Merula and Iacopo Antiquari. His Vocabulista, a Greek-Latin dictionary, was first printed probably in Milan and then re-printed twice before 1500 by Dionysius Bertochus. A translation of Constantine Lascaris's Erotemata was published on 29 September 1480, which was reprinted in 1489. Crastonus died after 1497, as is clear from a reference made to him in that year.

== Known works ==
- Lexicon graeco-latinum, printed not after 28 March 1478
- Lexicon latino-graecum or Vocabulista; no place [but probably Milan] or date; preface by Bonus Accursius
- [Bilingual edition of the Psalms], Milan, Bonus Accursius, 1481

== See also ==
- Greek scholars in the Renaissance
