= Giovanni Andrea Bussi =

Italian bishop and humanist (1417–1475)

Giovanni Andrea Bussi (1417–1475), also Giovan de' Bussi or Joannes Andreae, was an Italian Renaissance humanist and the Bishop of Aleria (from 1469). He was a major editor of classical texts and produced many incunabular editiones principes (first editions). In his hands the preface was expanded from its former role as a private letter to a patron, to become a public lecture, and at times a bully pulpit.

Bussi was a Platonist and a friend of Nicholas Cusanus and Bessarion, in whose philosophical circle he moved. From 1458 to the Cardinal's death in 1464 he had served Cusanus as a secretary at Rome, where he helped his master edit a ninth-century manuscript of the Opuscula and other works of Apuleius. From 1468 Bussi was the chief editor for the printing house of proto-typographers Arnold Pannartz and Konrad Sweynheim, after they moved it from Subiaco to Rome. He also heaped praise on Cusanus and Bessarion and used his dedicatory preface to Apuleius to laud Bessarion's Defensio Platonis. He also incorporated an edition of Alcinous translated by Pietro Balbi into his printing of Apuleius. The preface to this version elicited a correspondence with George of Trebizond and his son Andreas. Andreas attacked Bussi and Bessarion in a letter entitled Platonis Accusatio and Bussi directed a response to Andreas in the preface to his edition of Strabo. The debate lasted until 1472.

Cusanus, in his dialogue De non aliud of 1462, calls Bussi an expert on the Parmenides of Plato. Cusanus and Bussi edited William of Moerbeke's translation of the Expositio in Parmenidem of Proclus, and the marginalia they wrote into Cusanus' codex has even been published. The two also edited by hand the Asclepius of Hermes Trismegistus. While Cusanus writes in a Gothic script, Bussi uses a cursive Humanist minuscule. While Cusanus wrote lengthy marginal notes, Bussi preferred to keep those to a minimum and emend the text directly. The philology he used in his emendations, however, has been completely dismissed by modern scholarship and his attempted clarifications have been criticised as "rash" and "unfortunate".

Bussi also produced for Sweynheym and Parnnatz editions of the Epistolae of Jerome (1468), the Natural History of Pliny the Elder (1470), the complete works of Cyprian (1471), and the works of Aulus Gellius. Though his edition of Pliny was not the first (a 1469 printing at Venice preceded it), nonetheless it was criticised by Niccolò Perotti in a letter to Francesco Guarneri, secretary of cardinal-nephew Marco Barbo. Perotti attacks Bussi's practice, then common, of adding one's own preface to an ancient text, and also the quality and accuracy of his editing.

Bussi dedicated most of his editions to Pope Paul II, whom he served as the first papal librarian, as Perotti assumed his former position as press editor for Sweynheym and Parnnatz (1473). In 1472 he requested assistance for Sweynheim and Pannartz from Pope Sixtus IV, since the printers, who typically published 275 copies in a single edition, had an enormous unsold stock.

He coined the term media tempestas to refer to the Middle Ages, denoting a difference between the civilized Graeco-Roman past and the 'middle time' that separated his modern time with that glorious past.
