= Testimonies Against the Jews =

Testimonies Against The Jews is a 4th or 5th century pseudepigraphical text written in the name of Gregory of Nyssa which contains Old Testament testimonies against the Jews. Its author is often called Pseudo-Gregory.

== Authorship ==
The text is widely agreed to be pseudepigraphical. It is dated to the late 4th century at the earliest due to its familiarity with the Sabellian controversy. Some scholars prefer a 5th-century date after the death of Gregory of Nyssa.

== Contents ==
It mentions Simon the Magician.
