= Editio princeps =

First printed edition of a work that was previously only in manuscripts

In textual and classical scholarship, the editio princeps (Latin for first edition; plural: editiones principes) of a work is the first printed edition of a work that previously had existed only in manuscripts (which had to be copied by hand in order to circulate).

For example, the editio princeps of Homer is that of Demetrius Chalcondyles, now thought to be from 1488. The most important texts of classical Greek and Roman authors were for the most part produced in editiones principes in the years from 1465 to 1525, following the invention of the printing press around 1440.

In some cases there were possibilities of partial publication, of publication first in translation (for example from Greek to Latin), and of a usage that simply equates with first edition. For a work with several strands of manuscript tradition that have diverged, such as Piers Plowman, editio princeps is a less meaningful concept.

The term has long been extended by scholars to works not part of the Ancient Greek and Latin literatures. It is also used for legal works, and other significant documents.

For fuller lists of literature works, see:

- List of editiones principes in Latin
- List of editiones principes in Greek
- List of editiones principes in languages other than Latin or Greek

== Notable works ==
The following is a selection of notable literature works.

Date	Author, Work	Printer	Location	Comment
c. 1454	Biblia Vulgata	Johannes Gutenberg	Mainz	The 4th century translation of the Bible, two editions: 42 line and 36 line, see Gutenberg Bible.
1465	Cicero, De Oratore	Conradus Sweynheym and Arnoldus Pannartz	Subiaco	This edition was published without date but it is believed to be before September 1465.
1465–1470	Augustinus, Confessiones	Johannes Mentelin	Strasbourg	The second edition came out in Milan in 1475, followed by editions in 1482 and 1483. Other two incunable editions came from Strasbourg in 1489 and 1491, but the book was not separately reprinted until 1531.
1467	Augustinus, De Civitate Dei	Conradus Sweynheym and Arnoldus Pannartz	Subiaco	The following year Johannes Mentelin printed in Strasbourg another edition; it offered the earliest textual commentary, by Thomas Valois and Nicholas Trivet. For the next two centuries, the De Civitate was the most often printed of all Augustine's works; 17 editions appeared in the 15th century and eight in the 16th century.
1469	Livius	Conradus Sweynheym and Arnoldus Pannartz	Rome	Edited by Joannes Andreas de Buxis. The Rome edition included only Books 1–10, 21–32, 34–39 and a portion of 40. In a 1518 Mainz edition, the rest of Book 40 and part of 33 were published, while in a 1531 Basel edition, Books 41–45 were published, edited by Simon Grynaeus. He had discovered the only surviving manuscript of the fifth decade in 1527 while searching in the Lorsch Abbey in Germany. In 1616 the remaining part of Book 33 was published in Rome, by which all extant Livy had reached print.
1469	Periochae	Conradus Sweynheym and Arnoldus Pannartz	Rome	
1469	Vergilius	Conradus Sweynheym and Arnoldus Pannartz	Rome	Edited by Joannes Andreas de Buxis. Together with the three standard Virgilian works, Busi included the Appendix Vergiliana and Donatus' Vita Vergilii. He also included the Priapeia, then attributed to Virgil.
1469	Priapeia	Conradus Sweynheym and Arnoldus Pannartz	Rome	Edited by Joannes Andreas de Buxis. Together with the three standard Virgilian works, Busi included the Appendix Vergiliana and Donatus' Vita Vergilii. He also included the Priapeia, then attributed to Virgil.
1469	Appendix Vergiliana	Conradus Sweynheym and Arnoldus Pannartz	Rome	Edited by Joannes Andreas de Buxis. Together with the three standard Virgilian works, Busi included the Appendix Vergiliana and Donatus' Vita Vergilii. He also included the Priapeia, then attributed to Virgil.
1469	Aelius Donatus, Vita Vergilii	Conradus Sweynheym and Arnoldus Pannartz	Rome	Edited by Joannes Andreas de Buxis. Together with the three standard Virgilian works, Busi included the Appendix Vergiliana and Donatus' Vita Vergilii. He also included the Priapeia, then attributed to Virgil.
1469	Julius Caesar	Conradus Sweynheym and Arnoldus Pannartz	Rome	Edited by Joannes Andreas de Buxis.
1469	Plinius Maior	Johannes de Spira	Venice	
1469	Aulus Gellius	Conradus Sweynheym and Arnoldus Pannartz	Rome	Edited by Joannes Andreas de Buxis.
1470	Sallustius, Bellum Catilinae and Bellum Iugurthinum	Vindelinus de Spira	Venice	In the same year an edition of Sallust was also printed in Paris.
1470	Suetonius, De Vita Caesarum	Johannes Philippus de Lignamine	Rome	Edited by Johannes Antonius Campanus.
c. 1470	Tacitus, Historiae, Annales, Germania and Dialogus	Vindelinus de Spira	Venice	This edition only has books 11–16 of the Annales. Books 1–6 were rediscovered in 1508 in the Corvey Abbey (now in Germany) and brought to Rome. There they were printed by Étienne Guillery in 1515 together with the other books of the Annales while the edition was prepared by Filippo Beroaldo.
1471	Ovidius	Baldassarre Azzoguidi	Bologna	Edited by Franciscus Puteolanus. There is some dispute regarding the possibility it may have been preceded by the Roman edition printed by Sweynheym and Pannartz, which is without date but thought to be also from 1471.
c. 1471	Boethius, De Consolatione Philosophiae	Hans Glim	Savigliano	Undated, others have suggested the incunable's date to be 1473 or 1474. This would probably make the editio princeps the lavish edition that came out in Nuremberg in 1473 from Anton Koberger's press, containing a commentary traditionally attributed to Thomas of Aquin and a German translation.
1471–1472	Varro, De lingua latina	Georgius Lauer	Rome	Edited by Julius Pomponius Laetus
1472	Plautus	Johannes de Colonia-1470	Venice	Edited by Georgius Merula basing himself on the Codex Ursinianus. With a dedication to Iacopo Zeno, bishop of Padua.
1472	Macrobius, In Somnium Scipionis and Saturnalia	Nicolaus Jenson	Venice	
c. 1475	Beda, Historia Ecclesiastica gentis Anglorum	Heinrich Eggestein	Strasbourg	The edition is undated, but it is agreed to have been printed between 1474 and 1482. It was followed in the same town in 1500 by a second edition, this time bounded with a Latin translation of Eusebius' Historia Ecclesiastica.
1475	Seneca Philosophus, Dialogi, De beneficiis, De Clementia and Epistulae morales ad Lucilium	Matthias Moravus	Naples	The first complete edition of Seneca's philosophical works. Due to a confusion between the son and the father the volume also includes Seneca the Elder's widely known epitomized version composed of excerpts from his Suasoriae et Controversiae; the complete surviving text was printed in 1490 in Venice by Bernardinus de Cremona together with the younger Seneca. Also in the edition is Publilius Syrus, whose Sententiae are in the so-called Proverbia Senecae. The mistake was corrected in 1514 by Erasmus when the latter published in Southwark in 1514 an edition of Publilius that is generally considered to be the real editio princeps. Erasmus was followed in Leipzig in 1550 by Georg Fabricius, who also added twenty new sentences to the print.
1475	Seneca Rhetor	Matthias Moravus	Naples	
1475	Publilius Syrus	Matthias Moravus	Naples	
1475	Historia Augusta	Philippus de Lavagna	Milan	Edited by Bonus Accursius.
1510	Quintus Aurelius Symmachus, Epistulae and Relationes	Johann Schott	Strasbourg	
1512	Gregorius Turonensis, Historia Francorum and De Gloria Confessorum	Jodocus Badius Ascensius	Paris	
1512	Ado Viennensis, Chronicon	Jodocus Badius Ascensius	Paris	
1478–1479	Aesopus, Fabulae	B. & J. A. de Honate	Milan	Edited by Bonus Accursius. Undated, the book contained also a Latin translation by Ranuccio Tettalo. These 127 fables are known as the Collectio Accursiana, the newest of the three recensions that form the Greek Aesopica. The oldest Greek recension is the Collectio Augustana, in 231 fables, that was published only in 1812 by Johann Gottlob Theaenus Schneider in Breslau. The last recension is the Collectio Vindobonensis, made of 130 fables, that was first edited in 1776 by Thomas Tyrwhitt. Concerning The Aesop Romance, of it also three recensions exist: the one printed in this edition is the Vita Accursiana, while the second to be printed was in 1845 the Vita Westermanniana, edited in Braunschweig by Anton Westermann. The Last recension to be printed was the Vita Perriana, edited in 1952 in Urbana by Ben Edwin Perry.
1478–1479	Vita Aesopi	B. & J. A. de Honate	Milan	
c. 1482	Hesiodus, Opera et dies	B. & J. A. de Honate	Milan	Edited by Bonus Accursius. Undated, only Theocritus' first 18 idylls are contained in this edition. A wider arrange of idylls appeared in the 1495–1496 Aldine Theocritus which had idylls I-XXIII. A further amount of yet unpublished idylls were printed in Rome together with their old scholia by Zacharias Calliergis in his 1516 edition of Theocritus.
c. 1482	Theocritus, Idyllia	B. & J. A. de Honate	Milan	Edited by Bonus Accursius. Undated, only Theocritus' first 18 idylls are contained in this edition. A wider arrange of idylls appeared in the 1495–1496 Aldine Theocritus which had idylls I-XXIII. A further amount of yet unpublished idylls were printed in Rome together with their old scholia by Zacharias Calliergis in his 1516 edition of Theocritus.
1484–1487	Frontinus, De aqueductu	Pomponius Laetus, Sulpicius Veranus	Rome	Text of Frontinus De aq. based on manuscript acquired by Poggio Bracciolini in Monte Cassino monastery in 1429.
1484–1487	Vitruvius, De architectura	Pomponius Laetus, Sulpicius Veranus	Rome	Text of Frontinus De aq. based on manuscript acquired by Poggio Bracciolini in Monte Cassino monastery in 1429.
1488–1489	Homerus, Ilias and Odyssea		Florence	Edited by Demetrius Chalcondyles, the book was printed with the help of Demetrius Damilas that reelaborated the Greek types he had previously used in Milan. The editorial project was completed thanks to the financial support of Giovanni Acciaiuoli and the patronage of Neri and Bernardo de' Nerli together with, the latter also author of an opening dedication to Piero de' Medici. The edition includes also the previously printed Batrachomyomachia. As for the typography the volume has traditionally been attributed to the prolific printer Bartolomeo de' Libri, attribution denied by recent scholarship. The issue thus remains unresolved.
1488–1489	Hymni Homerici		Florence	
1488–1489	Ps.-Herodotus, De vita Homeri		Florence	
1488–1489	Ps.-Plutarch, De vita et poesi Homeri		Florence	
1488–1489	Dio Cocceianus, De Homero		Florence	
c. 1494	Euripides, Medea, Hippolytus, Alcestis and Andromache	Laurentius de Alopa	Florence	Edited by Janus Lascaris. The volume, undated, was printed sometime before June 18, 1494. The typographic font was, as usual with Lascaris, only made of capital letters.
1495–1498	Aristoteles	Aldus Manutius	Venice	An edition in five volumes in folio of the complete works of Aristotle. The first volume was printed in November 1495 while the last came out in 1498. Theophrastus' works came out together in 1497. Notably absent in this edition of Aristotle's works are the Rhetorica and the Poetica and also the Rhetorica ad Alexandrum. Concerning the Problemata, they came out in 1497 in its shorter recension in two books; the longer recension in four books came out in Paris in 1857 due to Hermann Usener. As for Theophrastus, all his published works came out in 1497 dispersed through the second, third and fourth volumes.
1495–1498	Theophrastus, De signis, De causis plantarum, De historia plantarum, De lapidibus, De igne, De odoribus, De ventis, De lassitudine, De vertigine, De sudore, Metaphysica, De piscibus in sicco degentibus	Aldus Manutius	Venice	
1495–1498	Porphyrius, Isagoge	Aldus Manutius	Venice	
1495–1498	Philo, De mundo	Aldus Manutius	Venice	
1495–1498	Ps.-Alexander Aphrodisiensis, Problemata	Aldus Manutius	Venice	
1495–1498	Diogenes Laërtius, Vita Aristotelis and Vita Theophrasti	Aldus Manutius	Venice	
1499	Suda	I. Bissolus & B. Mangius	Milan	Edited by Demetrius Chalcondyles.
1502	Sophocles	Aldus Manutius	Venice	
1502	Thucydides, Historiae	Aldus Manutius	Venice	
1502	Dionysius Halicarnasseus, Epistola ad Ammaeum II	Aldus Manutius	Venice	
1502	Herodotus, Historiae	Aldus Manutius	Venice	
1502	Stephanus Byzantinus, Ethnica	Aldus Manutius	Venice	
1503	Euripides	Aldus Manutius	Venice	This edition included all of the dramatist's plays except for Electra. Generally thought to have been edited by Marcus Musurus.
1503	Xenophon, Hellenica	Aldus Manutius	Venice	
1504	Demosthenes	Aldus Manutius	Venice	
1515	Aristophanes, Lysistrata and Thesmophoriazusae	Philippus Junta	Florence	First complete edition of all eleven Aristophanes' plays.
1516	Strabo, Geographica	Aldine Press	Venice	
1516	Pausanias, Graeciae descriptio	Aldine Press	Venice	Edited by Marcus Musurus.
1517	Plutarch, Vitae Parallelae	Philippus Junta	Florence	
1518	Aeschylus	Aldine Press	Venice	Edited by Franciscus Asulanus. This edition contains only 6 of Aeschylus' 7 surviving tragedies: missing is the Choephoroe. This is because the manuscripts had fused Agamemnon and Choephoroe, omitting lines 311–1066 of Agamemnon, a mistake that was corrected for the first time in 1552 in the Venetian edition edited by Franciscus Robortellus. The separation was not fully successful as the text was not correctly divided, leaving it to the 1557 Paris edition by Petrus Victorius, printed with an appendix by Henricus Stephanus, to finally obtain an adequate edition of Aeschylus' plays.
1530	Polybius, Historiae	Johannes Secerius	Hagenau	A part of Book VI had been already printed in Venice in 1529 by Johannes Antonio de Sabio, edited by Janus Lascaris with his Latin translation incorporated. The 1530 edition, edited by Vincentius Obsopoeus, only contained Books I–V together with their Latin translation made by Nicolaus Perottus. What survived of the rest of Polybius thanks to the excerpta antiqua of the other Books was first printed by Joannes Hervagius in Basel in 1549 together with a Latin translation by Wolfgang Musculus. Further Polybian excerpts came to light thanks to Fulvius Ursinus that in Antwerp in 1582 published Constantinus Porphyrogenitus' Excerpta de legationibus. All this additional material was incorporated in Isaac Casaubon's 1609 Polybius Paris edition.
1533	Ptolemaeus, Geographia	Hieronymus Frobenius	Basel	
1539	Diodorus Siculus, Bibliotheca historica	Johannes Oporinus	Basel	Edited by Vincentius Obsopoeus. Only books XVI–XX were printed. In 1559 Henricus Stephanus printed in Geneva all complete surviving books, that is I–V and XI–XX. To this Stephanus also added a summary left by Photius of the lost books.
1544	Archimedes	Joannes Hervagius	Basel	Edited by Thomas Gechauff Venatorius.
1544	Flavius Josephus	Hieronymus Frobenius & Nicolaus Episcopius	Basel	Edited by Arnoldus Arlenius. The volume also contained the 4 Maccabees, then attributed to Josephus.
1548	Cassius Dio	Robertus Stephanus	Paris	Only contains Books 23 and 36–58.
1551	Appianus	C. Stephanus	Paris	
1557	Joannes Zonaras, Annales	Johannes Oporinus	Basel	Edited by Hieronymus Wolfius.
1559	Marcus Aurelius, Meditationes	Andreas Gesner	Zürich	Edited by Guilielmus Xylander. Both texts are translated in Latin, the Meditationes by Xylander. He also added some passages on evidence regarding Marcus Aurelius taken from the Suda and from Aurelius Victor.
1610	Anna Comnena, Alexias	Ad insigne pinus	Augsburg	Edited by David Hoeschelius.
