= Bonaccorso da Pisa =

Bonaccorso da Pisa or Bonus Accursius Pisanus (fl. 1456–1480) was an Italian humanist, editor and publisher. Educated in Milan and Pavia and active in Pisa and Milan, he is best known for his many editions of Greek texts.

== Life ==
Bonaccorso was born in Pisa in the first half of the 15th century. He studied at Milan under Francesco Filelfo, whose letters are an important source of information on his early life. With a recommendation from Filelfo, he went to Pavia in 1456 to learn Greek under Andronikos Kallipolites. After 1461, he opened his own school in Pisa. In 1469, Demetrios Kastrenos taught there. In 1470, Filelfo invited him to set up a school of rhetoric in Milan, although he did not do so until after 1474.

In 1475, with Gian Francesco Della Torre's money, he purchased the library of Andronikos Kallistos for 200 ducats. In a letter announcing the purchase to Lorenzo the Magnificent, Della Torre describes 'master' Bonaccorso as 'a most learned man' (homo molto doctissimo). The date and place of his death are unknown.

== Works ==
Bonaccorso's edition of Laskaris' Erotemata in parallel columns of Greek and Latin

Bonaccorso writing, editing and publishing is all associated with his time in Milan. He wrote two works in Latin that were both printed in the same year:

- Animadversiones in C. I. Caesaris Commentaria (Ferrara, 1474)
- Plautina dicta memoratu digna (Milan, 1474)

In 1475, he edited several Latin works for the publisher Filippo Cavagni da Lavagna:

- Lorenzo Valla, Compendium Elegantiarum
- Agostino Dati, Isagogicus liber in eloquentiae praecepta
- Ovid, Metamorphoses, with the commentary of Lactantius Placidus
- Historia Augusta

The same year, for Antonio Zarotto, he edited the Dictorum et factorum memorabilium rubricae of Valerius Maximus. All of these works he dedicated to Cicco Simonetta. After 1475, he was only ever again involved in publishing Latin works on one occasion: the Epistulae ad Familiares of Cicero at Venice in 1480, with a commentary by Ubertino Chierico da Crescentino.

After 1475, Bonaccorso concerned himself mainly with the editing and publishing of works in Greek, succeeding Demetrios Damilas. Although he is sometimes given as the printer (e.g., Bonus Accursius impressit), he probably employed others to physically print copies. His first venture into Greek printing was the Lexicon Graeco Latinum of Giovanni Craston sometime before 1478, which he furnished with a dedicatory letter to Gian Francesco Della Torre. In 1480, he published the Psalterium Graeco Latinum, a Greek Psalter with Craston's Latin translation. It is his only Greek edition the came out with a date. For his edition of Constantine Laskaris's Erotemata (or Compendium octo Orationis partium) with another translation by Craston he provided a letter of dedication addressed to Pomponio Leto, dated 1480. All his other editions can only be conjecturally dated. They include:

- Aesop's fables (Aesopi Fabulae graece et latine) and the Aesopi Vita of Maximus Planudes in Greek with Latin translations by Ranuccio Tettalo
- Theocritus, Idyllia (an editio princeps based on a copy made by Kallistos)
- Hesiod, Opera et dies
- Johannes Crastonis, Vocabulista Latino Graecum
- Manuel Moschopoulos, Erotemata
- Demetrios Chalkokondyles, Erotemata
- Gregory of Corinth, De Dialectis
- Sassuolo da Prato, De accentibus ac diphtongis et formatione praeteritorum graecorum

There is an unpublished autograph of a letter from Bonaccorso to Lorenzo the Magnificent dated 2 October 1478 at Milan. As a specimen of Bonaccorso's handwriting, it can be used to identify notes he added to the manuscripts he acquired from Kallistos.

== Bibliography ==
- Ballistreri, Gianni (1969). "Bonaccorso da Pisa". Dizionario Biografico degli Italiani (in Italian). Vol. 11: Boccadibue–Bonetti. Rome: Istituto dell'Enciclopedia Italiana. ISBN 978-88-12-00032-6.
- Orlandi, Luigi (2023). Andronikos Kallistos: A Byzantine Scholar and His Manuscripts in Italian Humanism. De Gruyter.
