= Nyssa (Cappadocia) =

Town and bishopric in Asia Minor

- Νύσσα (Ancient Greek)
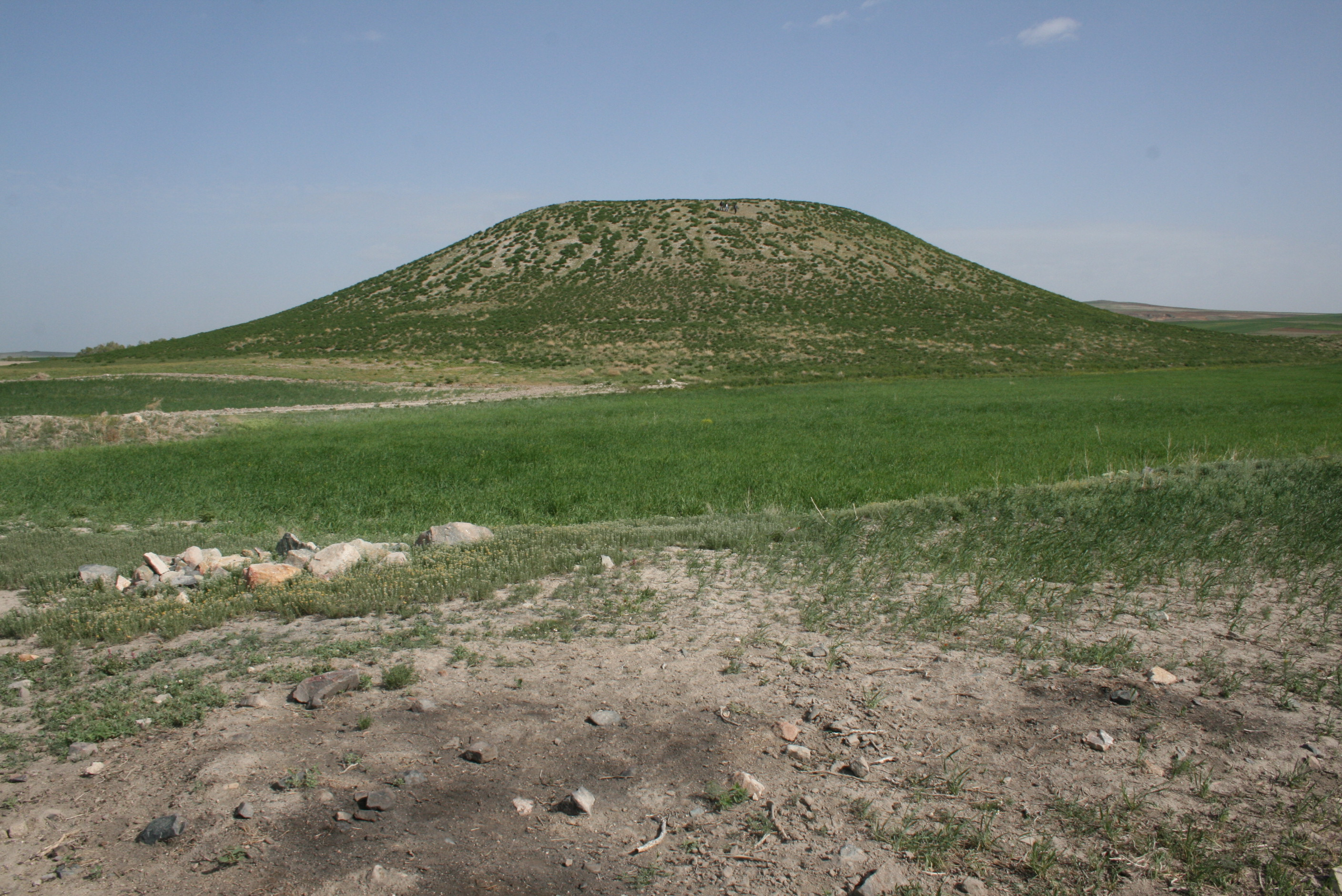
- Ruins of Nyssa

- Location within Turkey Location within Near East
- 38°57′15″N 33°57′33″E
- Location: Harmandalı, Ortaköy, Aksaray Province, Turkey
- Region: Central Anatolia

Nyssa (Ancient Greek: Νύσσα) was a town and bishopric in Cappadocia, Asia Minor. It is important in the history of Christianity due to being the see of the prominent 4th century bishop Gregory of Nyssa. Today, its name continues to be used as a titular see in the Eastern Orthodox Church and the Roman Catholic Church.

== Site and location ==
The Antonine Itinerary places it on the road from Ancyra to Caesarea, between Parnassos and Asiana, 24 Roman miles from Parnassus and 32 from Asiana. Ptolemy's Geography places it at 68°20' 38°40 (in his degrees) in the Prefecture of Murimene (Ancient Greek: Στρατηγίας Μουριμηνῆς). The Synecdemus and the Notitiae Episcopatuum indicate that Nyssa was in the Roman province of Cappadocia Prima.

The site of Nyssa has been identified as near the modern town of Harmandalı, Ortaköy district, Aksaray province, in south-central Turkey. The archaeological site consists of two tells, named Büyükkale (Great Castle) and Küçükkale (Little Castle), located 1 and 2 km to the north of Harmandalı with the town located 1 km north Another proposed location associates it with the modern city of Nevşehir, but modern scholarship has cast serious doubt on this.

William Smith's Dictionary of Greek and Roman Geography placed the town at a village, not otherwise mentioned, called Nirse or Nissa and said that it was anciently in a district called Muriane, not far from the river Halys.

== Ecclesiastical history ==
Nyssa was important enough in the Roman province of Cappadocia Prima to become a suffragan of its capital's Metropolitan, the Archdiocese of Caesarea in Cappadocia (Kayseri).

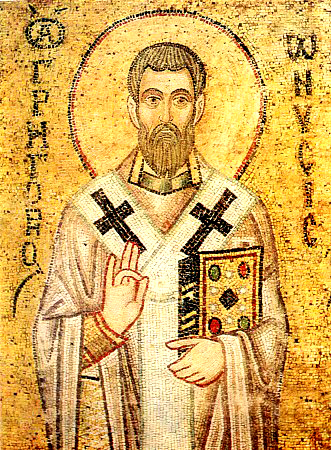
St. Gregory of Nyssa.

The earliest bishop of Nyssa whose name is known is Gregory of Nyssa, bishop of Nyssa from about 372 to 394 and brother of Basil the Great, bishop of Nyssa's metropolitan see, Caesarea in Cappadocia. The bishop at the time of the Council of Ephesus in 431 was Heraclides. Musonius took part in the Robber Council of Ephesus in 449, Ioannes in the Second Council of Constantinople in 553, another Ioannes in the Third Council of Constantinople in 680, Paulus in the Trullan Council in 693, a third Ioannes in the Second Council of Nicaea in 787, and Ignatius in the Photian Council of Constantinople (879). A 10th-century bishop named Germanus is known for his ecclesiastical writings.

The Eastern Orthodox Church has continued to appoint titular bishops of Nyssa even after the town and its Christian community ceased to exist. In practice, these titular bishops held jurisdiction over Orthodox Christian communities located elsewhere. Since 2012, the title "Bishop of Nyssa" is held by the bishop of the American Carpatho-Russian Orthodox Diocese.

== Sources and external links ==
- GCatholic – (former and) titular bishopric
