= Pietro Balbi =

Italian humanist

Pietro Balbi (or Petrus Balbus) (1399–1479), of Pisa, was an Italian humanist, a longtime member of the familia of Cardinal Bessarion who moved in the same circle as Nicolas Cusanus, whom he served with his expertise in Greek. During Pius II's pontificate, Balbi was the most prolific translator of Greek patristics in Rome, probably using the Greek manuscripts in Bessarion's own library. One of the quattrocento defenders of Plato, he translated for Cusanus the epitome of Platonic Philosophy, Disciplinarium Platonis epitome, of the 2nd-century philosopher Albinus and the immense Theologica Platonica of Proclus in 1462, and circulated it in manuscript. Giovanni Andrea Bussi printed his translation of Alcinous, and Cusanus cast Balbi and Bussi as interlocutors in his dialogue De lì non aliud in the winter of 1462.

Balbi played a role in the deconstructing of Pseudo-Dionysius the Areopagite, unmasking the dionysian corpus as apocryphal.

In 1463 Balbi, who was bishop of Nicotera, was appointed bishop of Tropea in Calabria.
