= Nicholas Smisko =

Metropolitan Nicholas (secular name: Richard Smiško; February 23, 1936 – March 13, 2011) was metropolitan bishop of Amissos and Primate of the American Carpatho-Russian Orthodox Diocese of the US.

== Early life ==
Richard Smisko was born in Perth Amboy, New Jersey on February 23, 1936. After graduating from Perth Amboy High School, he entered Christ the Saviour Seminary in Johnstown, Pennsylvania, to study for the Holy Priesthood. Upon graduation, he was ordained on January 11, 1959, by Bishop Orestes P. Chornock in Perth Amboy, N.J. His first pastorate was at Saints Peter and Paul Church in Windber, Pennsylvania, where he served until 1962.

== Priesthood and episcopacy ==
Smisko studied at the Theological School of Halki on the island of Heybeliada in the Sea of Marmara near Istanbul for one year. During his stay in the city, the young priest was assigned by the late Patriarch Athenagoras I to serve the spiritual needs of the large Slavic Orthodox community in the Galata section of Istanbul. He also traveled extensively throughout Europe and the Middle East, visiting the sacred sites of the Holy Land and living for a time on Mount Athos, the ancient monastic center of the Orthodox Church.

Upon his return to the United States, he resumed his studies at Youngstown State University, Ohio, and the University of Pittsburgh at Johnstown. He was then assigned as Prefect of Discipline at Christ the Saviour Seminary in Johnstown, and served several parishes in the Johnstown area, before relocating in 1971 to New York City, where he served as pastor of St. Nicholas Church.

He was elevated to the rank of Archimandrite in 1976, and was elected by the Holy Synod of the Ecumenical Patriarchate of Constantinople as Auxiliary Bishop for the Ukrainian Orthodox Church in America and was consecrated as Bishop of Amissos (modern day Samsun) on March 13, 1983.

Following the death of Bishop John (Martin) in September 1984, Bishop Nicholas was chosen as the third ruling hierarch of the American Carpatho-Russian Orthodox Diocese and was enthroned in Christ the Saviour Cathedral by Archbishop Iakovos of America on April 19, 1985.

He was elevated to the rank of Metropolitan, by Ecumenical Patriarch Bartholomew I on November 24, 1997.

In recognition for his labors Metropolitan Nicholas received the Saints Cyril and Methodius Award given by the Orthodox Church of Czechoslovakia, the St. Sava Award from Patriarch Pavle of the Serbian Orthodox Church and the honorary Doctor of Divinity degree from the Hellenic College and Holy Cross Greek Orthodox School of Theology.

== Death ==
Metropolitan Nicholas died on March 13, 2011, at Windber Hospital Hospice in Windber, Somerset County, Pennsylvania, from complications from cancer.
