= Gregory of Nyssa =

4th-century Christian bishop and theologian

Saint Gregory of Nyssa
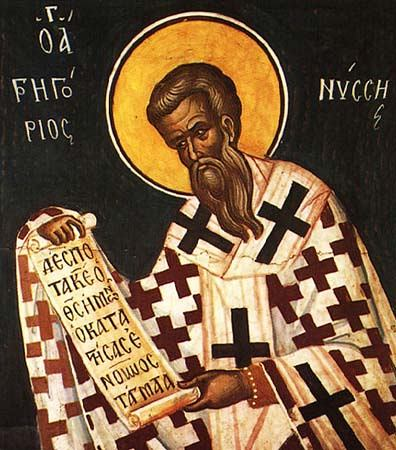
- Icon of Gregory; Stavronikita Monastery, 1545

Cappadocian Father
- Born: c. 335; Neocaesarea, Cappadocia, Roman Empire (modern-day Niksar, Tokat, Turkey)
- Died: c. 394 (aged 58–59); Nyssa, Cappadocia, Roman Empire (modern-day Harmandalı, Ortaköy, Aksaray, Turkey)
- Venerated in: Eastern Orthodox Church; Catholic Church; Oriental Orthodoxy; Anglicanism; Lutheranism
- Feast: 10 January (Eastern Christianity, Catholic Church since 2001, Lutheran Church–Missouri Synod); 26 Hathor (Coptic Christianity); 9 March (Catholic Church before 2001 and the Episcopal Church USA); 14 June, with Macrina (ELCA); 19 July, with Macrina (Anglican Communion)

Gregory of Nyssa (/ˈnɪsə/; Koine Greek: Γρηγόριος Νύσσης, romanized: Grēgórios Nýssēs, pronounced [ɣriˈɣo.ri.os ˈnys.sis]; c. 335 – c. 394), also known as Gregory Nyssen (/ˈnɪsən/; Γρηγόριος Νυσσηνός, Grēgórios Nyssēnós, [ɣriˈɣo.ri.os nys.siˈnos]), was an early Christian theologian who served as the bishop of Nyssa from 372 to 376 and from 378 until his death in 394. He is venerated as a saint in Eastern Orthodoxy, the Catholic Church, Oriental Orthodox Churches, Anglicanism, and Lutheranism. Gregory, his elder brother Basil of Caesarea, and their friend Gregory of Nazianzus are collectively known as the Cappadocian Fathers.

Gregory lacked the administrative ability of his brother Basil or the contemporary influence of Gregory of Nazianzus, but he was an erudite Christian theologian who made significant contributions to the doctrine of the Trinity and the Nicene Creed. Gregory's philosophical writings were influenced by Origen. Since the mid-twentieth century, there has been a significant increase in interest in Gregory's works from the academic community, particularly involving universal salvation, which has resulted in challenges to many traditional interpretations of his theology. Gregory is also notable for being the first person in recorded history to have written against all forms of slavery, declaring the institution inherently sinful.

== Background ==
The Acts of the Apostles depicts that on the Pentecost there were visiting Jews who were "residents of ...Cappadocia" in attendance in Acts 2:9. In the First Epistle of Peter, written after 65, the author greets Christians who are "exiles scattered throughout…Cappadocia". There is no further reference to Cappadocia in the rest of the New Testament.

Early Christianity arose in Cappadocia relatively late, with no evidence of a Christian community before the late second century. Alexander of Jerusalem was the first bishop of the province in the early to mid-third century, a period in which Christians suffered persecution from the local Roman authorities. The community remained very small throughout the third century: when Gregory Thaumaturgus acceded to the bishopric in c. 250, according to Gregory of Nyssa, there were only seventeen members of the Church in Caesarea.

Cappadocian bishops were among those at the First Council of Nicaea. Because of the broad distribution of the population, rural bishops (Koine Greek: χωρεπίσκοποι) were appointed to support the Bishop of Caesarea. During the late fourth century, there were around fifty of them. In Gregory's lifetime, the Christians of Cappadocia were devout, with the veneration of the Forty Martyrs of Sebaste and Saint George being particularly significant and represented by a considerable monastic presence. There were also some adherents of ante-Nicene period Christian sects later suppressed as heretical including Arians, Encratites and Messalians.

== Biography ==
=== Early life and education ===
Gregory was a Cappadocian Greek, born around 335, probably in or near the city of Neocaesarea, Pontus. His family was aristocratic and Christian—according to Gregory of Nazianzus, his mother was Emmelia of Caesarea, and his father, a rhetorician, has been identified either as Basil the Elder or as a Gregory. Among his eight siblings were St. Macrina the Younger, St. Naucratius, St. Peter of Sebaste and St. Basil of Caesarea. The precise number of children in the family was historically contentious: the commentary on 30 May in the Acta Sanctorum, for example, initially states that they were nine, before describing Peter as the tenth child. It has been established that this confusion occurred due to the death of one son in infancy, leading to ambiguities in Gregory's own writings. Gregory's parents had suffered persecution for their faith: he writes that they "had their goods confiscated for confessing Christ." Gregory's paternal grandmother, Macrina the Elder, is also revered as a saint and his maternal grandfather was a martyr, as Gregory put it "killed by Imperial wrath" under the persecution of the Roman Emperor Maximinus II. Between the 320s to the early 340s, the family rebuilt its fortunes, with Gregory's father working in the city of Neocaesarea as an advocate and rhetorician.

Gregory's temperament is said to have been quiet and meek, in contrast to his brother Basil who was known to be much more outspoken. Gregory was first educated at home, by his mother Emmelia and sister Macrina. Little is known of what further education he received. Apocryphal hagiographies depict him studying at Athens, but this is speculation probably based on the life of his brother Basil. It seems more likely that he continued his studies in Caesarea, where he read classical literature, philosophy and perhaps medicine. Gregory himself claimed that his only teachers were Basil, "Paul, John and the rest of the Apostles and prophets".

While his brothers Basil and Naucratius lived as hermits from c. 355, Gregory initially pursued a non-ecclesiastical career as a rhetorician. He did, however, act as a lector. He is known to have married a woman named Theosebia during this period, who is sometimes identified with Theosebia the Deaconess, venerated as a saint by Orthodox Christianity. This is controversial, however, and other commentators suggest that Theosebia the Deaconess was one of Gregory's sisters.

=== Episcopate ===
In 371, the Emperor Valens split Cappadocia into two new provinces, Cappadocia Prima and Cappadocia Secunda. This resulted in complex changes in ecclesiastical boundaries, during which several new bishoprics were created. Gregory was elected bishop of the new see of Nyssa in 372, presumably with the support of his brother Basil, who was metropolitan of Caesarea. Gregory's early policies as bishop often went against those of Basil; for instance, while his brother condemned the Sabellianist followers of Marcellus of Ancyra as heretics, Gregory may have tried to reconcile them with the church.

Gregory faced opposition to his reign in Nyssa and, in 373, Amphilochius, bishop of Iconium, had to visit the city to quell discontent. In 375, Desmothenes of Pontus convened a synod at Ancyra to try Gregory on charges of embezzlement of church funds and irregular ordination of bishops. He was arrested by imperial troops in the winter of the same year but escaped to an unknown location. The synod of Nyssa, which was convened in the spring of 376, deposed him. However, Gregory regained his see in 378, perhaps due to an amnesty promulgated by the new emperor, Gratian. In the same year Basil died, and despite the relative unimportance of Nyssa, Gregory took over many of his brother's former responsibilities in Pontus.

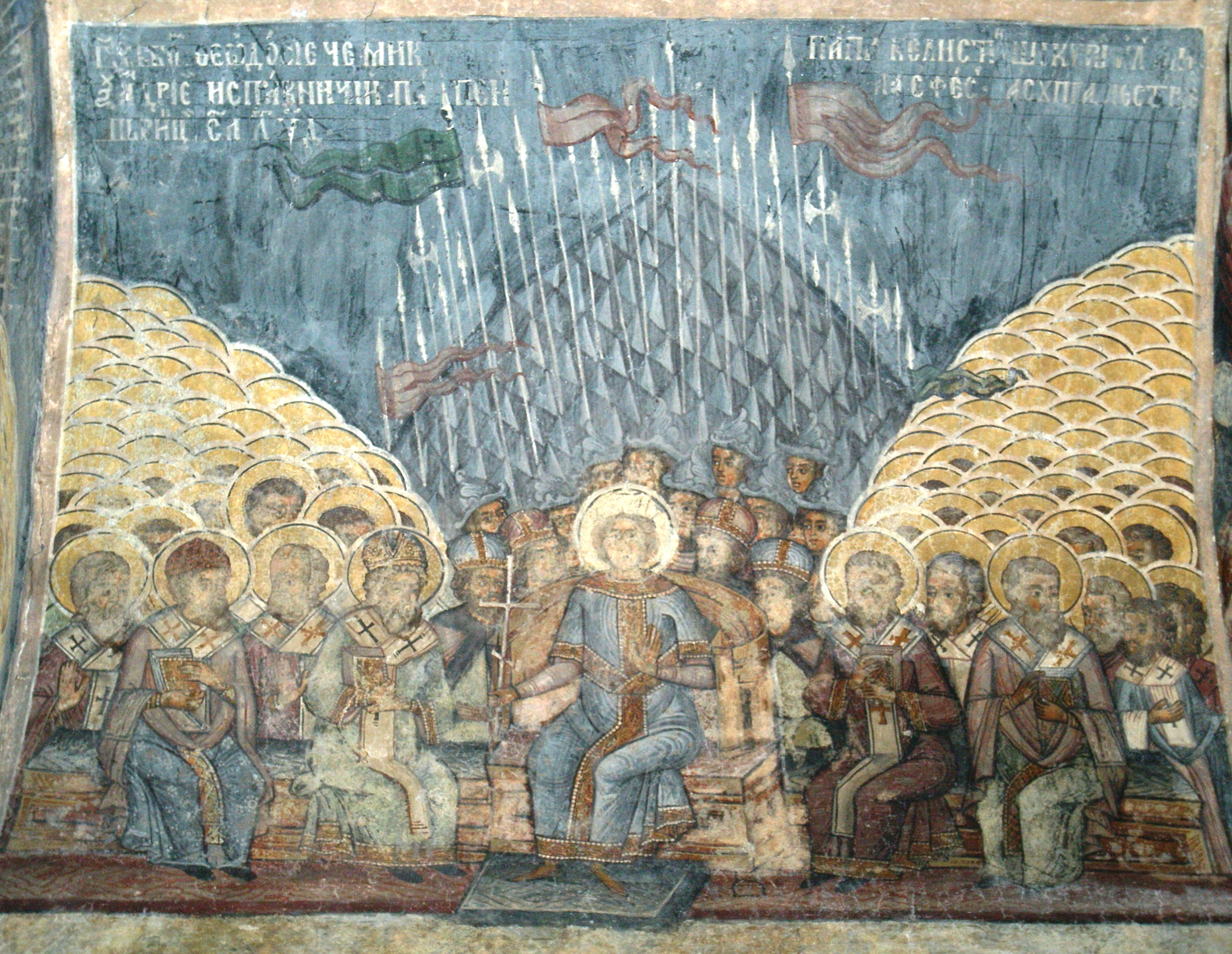
The First Council of Constantinople, as depicted in a fresco in the Stavropoleos Monastery, Bucharest, Romania.

He was present at the Synod of Antioch in April 379, where he unsuccessfully attempted to reconcile the followers of Meletius of Antioch with those of Paulinus. After visiting the village of Annisa to see his dying sister, Macrina, he returned to Nyssa in August. In 380 he travelled to Sebaste, in the province of Armenia Prima, to support a pro-Nicene candidate for the election to the bishopric. To his surprise, he himself was elected to the seat, perhaps due to the population's association of him with his brother. However, Gregory deeply disliked the relatively unhellenized society of Armenia, and he was confronted by an investigation into his orthodoxy by local opponents of the Nicene theology. After a stay of several months, a substitute was found—possibly Gregory's brother Peter, who was bishop of Sebaste from 381—and Gregory returned home to Nyssa to write books I and II of Against Eunomius.

Gregory participated in the First Council of Constantinople (381), and perhaps gave there his famous sermon In suam ordinationem. He was chosen to eulogise at the funeral of Meletius, which occurred during the council. The council sent Gregory on a mission to Arabia, perhaps to ameliorate the situation in Bostra where two men, Agapius and Badagius, claimed to be bishop. If this is the case, Gregory was unsuccessful, as the see was still contested in 394. He then travelled to Jerusalem where Cyril of Jerusalem faced opposition from local clergy due to the fact that he had been ordained by Acacius of Caesarea, an Arian who had been deposed as heretical. Gregory's attempted mediation of the dispute was unsuccessful, and he himself was accused of holding unorthodox views on the nature of Christ.

The later reign of Gregory in Nyssa was marked by conflict with his metropolitan, Helladius. Gregory was present at a 394 synod convened at Constantinople to discuss the continued problems in Bostra. While the year of his death is unknown, it is generally accepted that he died in 394.

== Theology ==
The traditional view of Gregory is that he was an orthodox Trinitarian theologian, who was influenced by the Neoplatonism of Plotinus and believed in universal salvation following Origen. However, as a highly original and sophisticated thinker, Gregory is difficult to classify, and many aspects of his theology are contentious among both conservative Eastern Orthodox theologians and Western academic scholarship. This is often due to the lack of systematic structure and the presence of terminological inconsistencies in Gregory's work.

=== Conception of the Trinity ===
Gregory, following Basil, defined the Trinity as "one essence [οὐσία] in three persons [ὑποστάσεις]", the formula adopted by the Council of Constantinople in 381. Like the other Cappadocian Fathers, he was a homoousian, and Against Eunomius affirms the truth of the consubstantiality of the trinity over Eunomius' Aristotelian belief that the Father's substance is unengendered, whereas the Son's is engendered. According to Gregory, the differences between the three persons of the Trinity reside in their differing hypostatic origin, and the triune nature of God is revealed through divine action (despite the unity of God in His action). The Son is therefore defined as begotten of the Father, the Holy Spirit as proceeding from the Father, and the Father by his role as progenitor. However, this doctrine would seem to subordinate the Son to the Father, and the Holy Spirit to the Son. Robert Jenson suggests that Gregory implies that each member of the Godhead has an individual priority: the Son has epistemological priority, the Father has ontic priority and the Spirit has metaphysical priority. Other commentators disagree: Morwenna Ludlow, for instance, argues that epistemic priority resides primarily in the Spirit in Gregory's theology.

Modern proponents of social trinitarianism often claim to have been influenced by the Cappadocians' dynamic picture of the Trinity. However, it would be fundamentally incorrect to identify Gregory as a social Trinitarian, as his theology emphasises the unity of God's will, and he clearly believes that the identities of the Trinity are the three persons, not the relations between them.

=== Infinitude of God ===
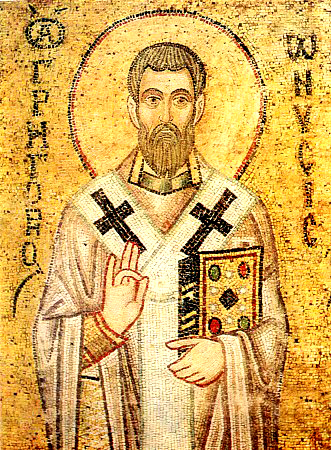
11th-century mosaic of Gregory of Nyssa. Saint Sophia Cathedral in Kyiv, Ukraine.

Gregory was one of the first theologians to argue that God is infinite. His main argument for the infinity of God, found in Against Eunomius, is that God's goodness is limitless, and as God's goodness is essential, God is also limitless.

An important consequence of Gregory's belief in the infinity of God is his belief that God, as limitless, is essentially incomprehensible to the limited minds of created beings. In Life of Moses, Gregory writes: "...every concept that comes from some comprehensible image, by an approximate understanding and by guessing at the Divine nature, constitutes an idol of God and does not proclaim God." Gregory's theology was thus apophatic: he proposed that God should be defined in terms of what we know He is not rather than what we might speculate Him to be.

Accordingly, the Nyssen taught that due to God's infinitude, a created being can never reach an understanding of God, and thus for man in both life and the afterlife there is a constant progression [ἐπέκτασις] towards the unreachable knowledge of God, as the individual continually transcends all which has been reached before. In the Life of Moses, Gregory speaks of three stages of this spiritual growth: initial darkness of ignorance, then spiritual illumination, and finally a darkness of the mind in mystic contemplation of the God who cannot be comprehended.

=== Universalism ===
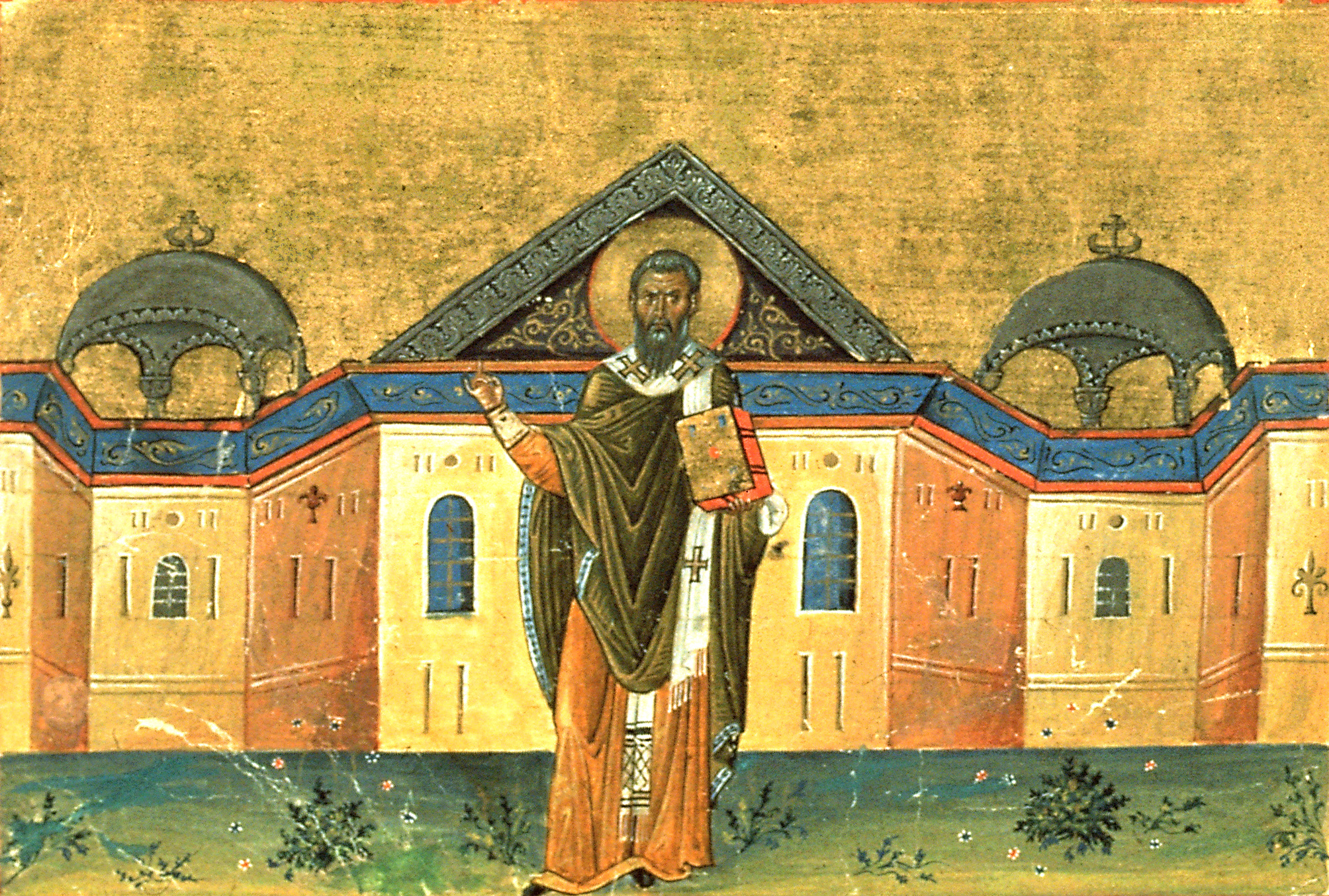
Saint Gregory of Nyssa, Menologion of Basil II, 10th century

Gregory was one of the earlier proponents of Christian universalism. Gregory argues that when Paul says that God will be "all in all" (1 Cor 15:28), this means that though some may need to undergo a long period of purification, eventually "no being will remain outside the number of the saved" and that "no being created by God will fall outside the Kingdom of God". Due to the unity of human nature in Christ "all, thanks to the union with one another, will be joined in communion with the Good, in Jesus Christ Our Lord". Christ's incarnation, death and resurrection results in "total salvation for human nature".

Gregory also described God's work this way: "His [God's] end is one, and one only; it is this: when the complete whole of our race shall have been perfected from the first man to the last—some having at once in this life been cleansed from evil, others having afterwards in the necessary periods been healed by the Fire, others having in their life here been unconscious equally of good and of evil—to offer to every one of us participation in the blessings which are in Him, which, the Scripture tells us, 'eye hath not seen, nor ear heard,' nor thought ever reached." That this is what Gregory believed and taught is affirmed by most scholars. A minority of scholars have argued that Gregory affirmed only the universal resurrection.

In the Life of Moses, Gregory writes that just as the darkness left the Egyptians after three days, perhaps redemption [ἀποκατάστασις] will be extended to those suffering in hell [γέεννα]. This salvation may extend not only to humans; following Origen, there are passages where he seems to suggest (albeit through the voice of Macrina) that even the demons will have a place in Christ's "world of goodness". Gregory's interpretations of 1 Cor. 15:28 ("And when all things shall be subdued unto him ...") Philippians 2:10 ("That at the name of Jesus every knee should bow, of things in heaven, and things in earth, and things under the earth") support this understanding of his theology.

Nevertheless, in the Great Catechism, Gregory suggests that while every human will be resurrected, salvation will be accorded only to the baptised, although he also states that others driven by their passions can be saved after being purified by fire. While he believes that there will be no more evil in the hereafter, it is arguable that this does not preclude a belief that God might justly damn sinners for eternity. Thus, the main difference between Gregory's conception of ἀποκατάστασις and that of Origen would be that Gregory believes that mankind will be collectively returned to sinlessness, whereas Origen believes that personal salvation will be universal. This interpretation of Gregory has recently been criticized, however. After all, at the end of chapter XXXV of the Great Catechism Gregory writes that those who have not been purified by water through baptism "must needs be purified by fire" so that "after long succeeding ages, their nature may be restored pure again to God".

Attempting to reconcile these disparate positions, Eastern Orthodox theologian Dr. Mario Baghos notes that "when taken at face value the saint seems to be contradicting himself in these passages; on the one hand he asserted the salvation of all and the complete eradication of evil, and, on the other, that the fire needed to purge evil is 'sleepless', i.e. everlasting. The only solution to this inconsistency is to view any allusion to universal salvation in St Gregory as an expression of God's intention for humanity, which is in fact attested to when his holy sister states that God has "one goal ... some straightway even in this life purified from evil, others healed hereafter through fire for the appropriate length of time." That we can choose either to accept or ignore this purification is confirmed by the saint's many exhortations that we freely undertake the virtuous path." Dr. Ilaria Ramelli has made the observation that for Gregory free will was compatible with universal salvation since every person would eventually accept the good having gone through purification. Nevertheless, some interpret Gregory as conceding that Judas and similar sinners will never be completely purified when he wrote, "that which never existed is to be preferred to that which has existed in such sin. For, as to the latter, on account of the depth of the ingrained evil, the chastisement in the way of purgation will be extended into infinity". However, Ramelli renders the original Greek "εἰς ἄπειρον παρατείνεται ἡ διὰ τῆς καθάρσεως κόλασις" as "the punishment provided for the purpose of purification will tend to an indefinite duration."

=== Anthropology ===
Gregory's anthropology is founded on the ontological distinction between the created and uncreated. Man is a material creation, and thus limited, but infinite in that his immortal soul has an indefinite capacity to grow closer to the divine. Gregory believed that the soul is created simultaneous to the creation of the body (in opposition to Origen, who believed in preexistence), and that embryos were thus persons. To Gregory, the human being is exceptional, being created in the image of God. Humanity is theomorphic both in having self-awareness and free will, the latter which gives each individual existential power, because to Gregory, in disregarding God one negates one's own existence.

In the Song of Songs, Gregory metaphorically describes human lives as paintings created by apprentices to a master: the apprentices (the human wills) imitate their master's work (the life of Christ) with beautiful colours (virtues), and thus man strives to be a reflection of Christ. Gregory, in stark contrast to most thinkers of his age, saw great beauty in the Fall: from Adam's sin from two perfect humans would eventually arise myriad.

==== Opposition to slavery ====
Gregory is claimed to be the first voice in the ancient world known to write against all forms of slavery, declaring the institution inherently sinful.

If [man] is in the likeness of God, ... who is his buyer, tell me? Who is his seller? To God alone belongs this power; or rather, not even to God himself. [...] God would not therefore reduce the human race to slavery, since [God] himself, when we had been enslaved to sin, spontaneously recalled us to freedom. But if God does not enslave what is free, who is he that sets his own power above God's?

— St. Gregory of Nyssa, Homilies on Ecclesiastes, The evils of slave-owning; Hall and Moriarty, trs., de Gruyter (New York, 1993) p. 74.

Gregory used Plato's definition of virtue as "something that admits of no master [ἀδέσποτον]" in the service of his own theological arguments against slavery: (1) each human is an image of God and therefore free, (2) the equality of all humans reflects the equality of the divine Persons, and (3) just as the divine nature cannot be divided into slavery (δουλεία) and mastery (δυναστεία, κυριότης), neither can human nature; the whole creation is a slave but of God alone.

The Stoic Seneca had criticized cruel slave masters and advised slave masters to treat slaves with kindness (or at least those of good character), but in addition to that, Stoicism held that slavery was "contrary to nature", a hugely important thing for them, being that to "live in accordance with nature" was their central ethical precept. Other ancient philosophers such as Plato and Aristotle supported slavery as natural. Certain Stoics went as far as actual abolitionism. Eumenes III led an abolitionist rebellion, inspired by Stoic philosopher Gaius Blossius, who himself participated in it. Even though some claim Gregory of Nyssa's critique was the first and only critique of the institution of slavery itself made in the ancient world, there are other examples of it, such as the Essenes forcefully condemning the institution itself centuries before Gregory.

=== Neoplatonism ===
There are many similarities between Gregory's theology and Neoplatonism, especially that of Plotinus. Specifically, they share the idea that the reality of God is completely inaccessible to human beings and that man can come to see God only through a spiritual journey in which knowledge (gnosis) is rejected in favour of meditation. Gregory does not refer to any Neoplatonist philosophers in his work, and there is only one disputed passage which may directly quote Plotinus. Considering this, it seems possible that Gregory was familiar with Plotinus and perhaps other figures in Neoplatonism. However, some significant differences exist between Neoplatonism and Gregory's thought, such as Gregory's assertion that beauty and goodness are equivalent, which contrasts with Plotinus' view that they are distinct qualities. However Plotinus does say, "And Beauty, this Beauty which is also the Good", implying the Monad which is the Good is also Beauty in Enneads 6:1, Beauty:6.

Eastern Orthodox theologians are generally critical of the theory that Gregory was influenced by Neoplatonism. For example, Hierotheos Vlachos argues in Life After Death that Gregory opposed all philosophical (as opposed to theological) endeavour as tainted with worldliness. This view is supported by Against Eunomius, where Gregory denounces Eunomius for placing the results of his systematic Aristotelianism above the traditional teachings of the Church.

== Feast day ==
The Eastern Orthodoxy and Eastern Catholic Churches commemorate Gregory of Nyssa on 10 January. The Latin Church, following editions of the Roman Martyrology published prior to the Second Vatican Council, along with The Calendar of the Church Year of the Episcopal Church commemorate his death on 9 March. Editions of the Roman Martyrology published after the year 2000 list his feast day under 10 January. The Lutheran Church – Missouri Synod commemorates Gregory along with the other Cappadocian Fathers on 10 January.

Gregory is remembered in the Church of England (with Macrina the Younger) with a lesser festival on 19 July.

== Legacy ==
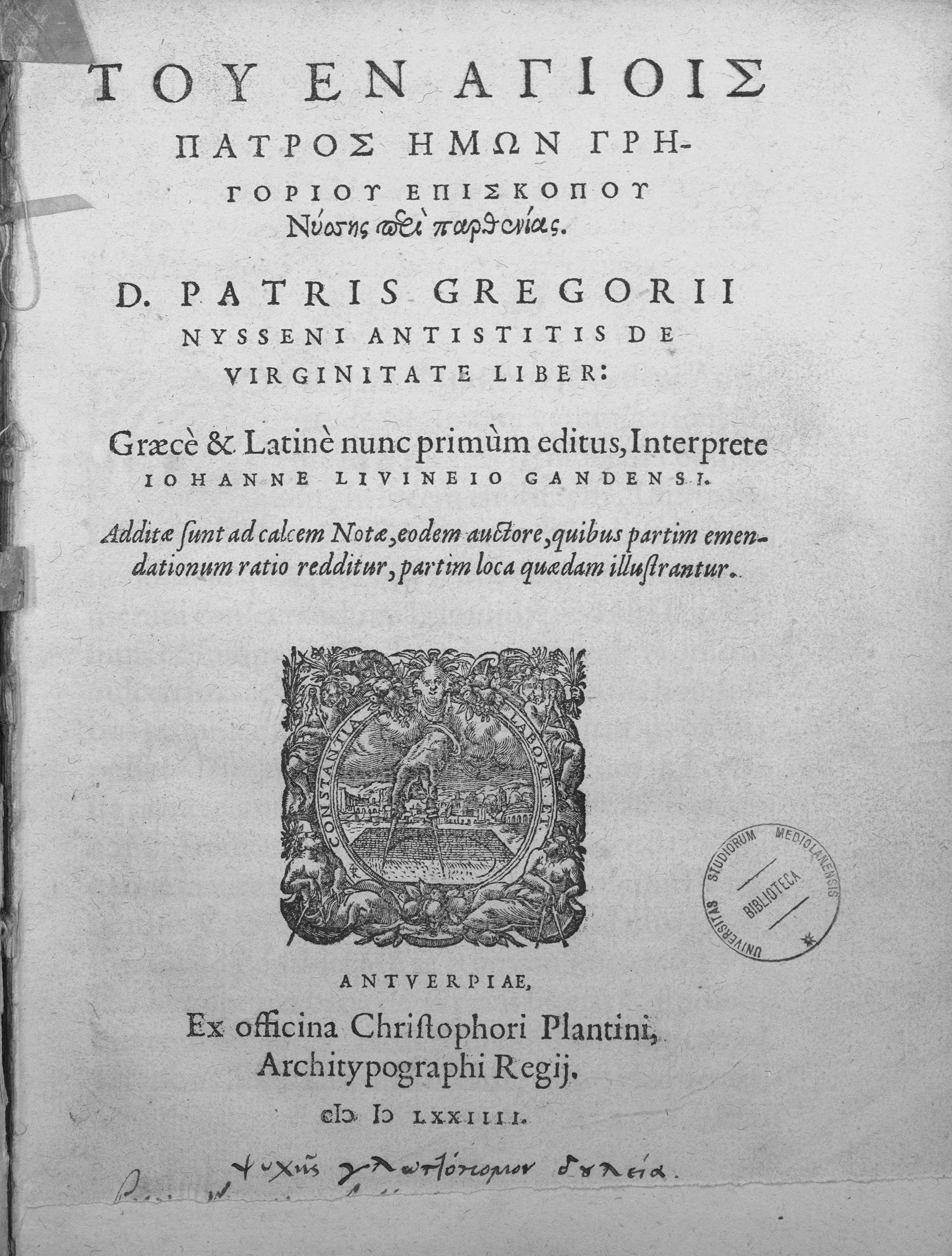
De virginitate

Gregory is revered as a saint. However, unlike the other Cappadocian fathers, he is not a Doctor of the Church. He is venerated chiefly in the East. His relics were held by the Vatican until 2000 when a portion of them were transferred to the Greek Orthodox church of St. Gregory of Nyssa, San Diego, California.

Professor of theology, Natalie Carnes wrote: "One reason Gregory was not taken up into the theological stream in the West is that he was little translated into Latin. John Scotus Eriugena (c. 800–c. 877) should be greatly credited for the influence Gregory did have. Not only was Eriugena himself influenced by Gregory, but he also translated On the Making of the Human into Latin."

Gregory's work received little scholarly attention in the West until the mid-twentieth century, and he was historically treated as a minor figure in comparison to Basil the Great or Gregory of Nazianzus. As late as 1942, Hans Urs von Balthasar wrote that his work was virtually unknown. However, the 6th-century Latin translation of De opificio hominis by Dionysius Exiguus was very widespread in the Medieval period, and Francisco Bastitta Harriet argues that Nyssen's conceptions of indeterminate human nature and ontological freedom were among the core influences on Renaissance anthropology, particularly on the works of Nicholas of Cusa and Giovanni Pico della Mirandola. "The renewed enthusiasm of 15th-century philosophers and humanists for classical antiquity also led to a revival of the study and translation of Greek patristic works. Against this background, some of Gregory of Nyssa's works which remained unknown to the West during the medieval centuries received their first Latin translations by leading representatives of Italian and Byzantine culture." These include the early Renaissance translations of De vita Moysis by George of Trebizond in 1446, of De vita Macrinae and De anima et resurrectione by Pietro Balbi between 1465 and 1473, and of De oratione dominica by the Byzantine scholar Athanasius Chalkeopoulos around 1465.

In part due to the scholarship of Balthasar and Jean Daniélou, by the 1950s Gregory had become the subject of much serious theological research, with a critical edition of his work published (Gregorii Nysseni Opera), and the founding of the International Colloquium on Gregory of Nyssa. This attention has continued to the present day. Modern studies have focused on Gregory's eschatology rather than his more dogmatic writings, and he has gained a reputation as an unconventional thinker whose thought arguably prefigures postmodernism. Major figures in contemporary research include Sarah Coakley, John Zizioulas and Robert Jenson. In 2003, Eastern Orthodox philosopher and theologian David Bentley Hart published a book seemingly influenced by Gregory.

== Commentary on Gregory ==
In 787, the Second Council of Nicaea, the last of the first seven ecumenical councils, honored Gregory of Nyssa:

Let us then, consider who were the venerable doctors and indomitable champions of the Church [including] Gregory Primate of Nyssa, who all have called the father of fathers.

Henry Fairfield Osborn wrote in his work on the history of evolutionary thought, From the Greeks to Darwin (1894):

Among the Christian Fathers the movement towards a partly naturalistic interpretation of the order of Creation was made by Gregory of Nyssa in the fourth century, and was completed by Augustine in the fourth and fifth centuries. ...[Gregory] taught that Creation was potential. God imparted to matter its fundamental properties and laws. The objects and completed forms of the Universe developed gradually out of chaotic material.

Anthony Meredith writes of Gregory's mystical and apophatic writings in his book Gregory of Nyssa (The Early Church Fathers) (1999):

Gregory has often been credited with the discovery of mystical theology, or rather with the perception that darkness is an appropriate symbol under which God can be discussed. There is much truth in this....Gregory seems to have been the first Christian writer to have made this important point.

J. Kameron Carter writes about Gregory's stance on slavery, in the book Race a Theological Account (2008):

What interests me is the defining features of Gregory's vision of the just society: his unequivocal stance against 'the peculiar institution of slavery' and his call for the manumission of all slaves. I am interested in reading Gregory as a fourth century abolitionist intellectual....His outlook surpassed not only St. Paul's more moderate (but to be fair to Paul, in his moment, revolutionary) stance on the subject but also those of all ancient intellectuals -- Pagan, Jewish and Christian - from Aristotle to Cicero and from Augustine in the Christian West to his contemporary, the golden mouthed preacher himself, John Crysotom in the East. Indeed, the world would have to wait another fifteen centuries -- until the nineteenth century, late into the modern abolitionist movement -- before such an unequivocal stance against slavery would appear again.

Catholic theologian and author Hans Urs von Balthasar, describes Gregory in his book Presence and Thought: An Essay on the Religious Philosophy of Gregory of Nyssa (1988):

Less prolific than Origen, less cultivated than Gregory Nazianzen, less practical than Basil, Gregory of Nyssa nonetheless outstrips them all in the profundity of his thought.

== Bibliography ==
The complete works of Gregory of Nyssa are published in the original Greek with Latin commentary as Gregorii Nysseni Opera:

- Vol. 1 - Werner Jaeger, ed. (2002). Contra Eunomium libri I et II. Brill. ISBN 978-90-04-03007-7.
- Vol. 2 - Werner Jaeger, ed. (2002). Contra Eunomium liber III. Brill. ISBN 978-90-04-03934-6.
- Vol. 3/1 - Friedrich Müller, ed. (1958). Opera dogmatica minora, pars I. Brill. ISBN 978-90-04-04788-4.
- Vol. 3/2 - K. Kenneth Downing; Jacobus A. McDonough; S.J. Hadwiga Hörner, eds. (1987). Opera dogmatica minora, pars II. Brill. ISBN 978-90-04-07003-5.
- Vol. 3/3 - Opera dogmatica minora, pars III - De Anima Et Resurrectione, 2014 Publisher=Brill ISBN 978-90-04-12242-0 Editor: Andreas Spira
- Vol. 3/4 - Ekkehard Mühlenberg, ed. (1996). Opera dogmatica minora, pars IV. Brill. ISBN 978-90-04-10348-1.
- Vol. 3/5 - Ekkehard Mühlenberg, ed. (2008). Opera dogmatica minora, pars V. Brill. ISBN 978-90-04-13314-3.
- Vol. 4/1 - Hubertus R. Drobner, ed. (2009). Opera exegetica In Genesim, pars I. Brill. ISBN 978-90-04-13315-0.
- Vol. 4/2 - Opera exegetica In Genesim, pars II - currently unavailable.
- Vol. 5 - J. McDonough; P. Alexander, eds. (1986). In Inscriptiones Psalmorum: In Sextum Psalmum: In Ecclesiasten Homiliae. Brill. ISBN 978-90-04-08186-4.
- Vol. 6 - H. Langerbeck, ed. (1986). In Canticum Canticorum. Brill. ISBN 978-90-04-08187-1.
- Vol. 7/1 - John F. Callahan, ed. (2009). Opera exegetica In Exodum et Novum Testamentum, pars 1. Brill. ISBN 978-90-04-00747-5.
- Vol. 7/2 - John F. Callahan, ed. (1992). Opera exegetica In Exodum et Novum Testamentum, pars 2. Brill. ISBN 978-90-04-09598-4.
- Vol. 8/1 - Werner Jaeger; J.P. Cavarnos; V.W. Callahan, eds. (1986). Opera ascetica et Epistulae, pars 1. Brill. ISBN 978-90-04-08188-8.
- Vol. 8/2 - Giorgio Pasquali, ed. (2002). Opera ascetica et Epistulae, pars 2. Brill. ISBN 978-90-04-11182-0.
- Vol. 9 - G. Heil; A. van Heck; E. Gebhardt; A. Spira, eds. (1992). Sermones, pars 1. Brill. ISBN 978-90-04-00750-5.
- Vol. 10/1 - G. Heil; J. P. Cavarnos; O. Lendle, eds. (1990). Sermones, pars 2. Brill. ISBN 978-90-04-08123-9.
- Vol. 10/2 - Ernestus Rhein; Friedhelm Mann; Dörte Teske; Hilda Polack, eds. (1996). Sermones, pars 3. Brill. ISBN 978-90-04-10442-6.

The following are editions of English translations of Gregory's writings:

- Gregory of Nyssa, Homilies on Ecclesiastes: An English Version with Supporting Studies. Proceedings of the Seventh International Colloquium on Gregory of Nyssa (St Andrews, 5–10 September 1990). Link.
- Gregory of Nyssa, Life of Macrina, limovia.net, London, 2012. ISBN 978-1-78336-017-8

== Sources ==
- Azkoul, Michael (1995). St. Gregory of Nyssa and the Tradition of the Fathers. Lewiston, NY: E. Mellen Press. ISBN 0-7734-8993-2.
- Bastitta Harriet, Francisco (2023). An Ontological Freedom: The Origins of the Notion in Gregory of Nyssa and its Influence unto the Italian Renaissance. Paderborn: Brill-Schöningh. ISBN 978-3-506-79506-9.
- Ene D-Vasilescu, Elena (2021). "Chapter 6: "Gregory of Nyssa's fourth century water organ (a reconstruction) and the elements of Creation in his texts: water, air, fire, and earth"". In Ene D-Vasilescu, Elena (ed.). Glimpses into Byzantium. Byzantine and Modern. Oxford: Indep. pp. 127–140. ISBN 978-1-80049-880-8.
- Ene D-Vasilescu, Elena (2021). "Chapter 7: "The epektasis [ἐπέκτασις] and the exploits of the soul (ἡ ψυχή) in Gregory of Nyssa's De anima et resurrectione/On the Soul and the Resurrection"". In Ene D-Vasilescu, Elena (ed.). Glimpses into Byzantium. Byzantine and Modern. Oxford: Indep. pp. 140–158. ISBN 978-1-80049-880-8.
- Ene D-Vasilescu, Elena (2017). "Chapter 55: Gregory of Nyssa". In Esler, Philip F. (ed.). The Early Christian World. Routledge - Taylor & Francis Group. pp. 1072–1987.
- Hart, David Bentley (February 2001). "The 'Whole Humanity': Gregory of Nyssa's Critique of Slavery in Light of His Eschatology". Scottish Journal of Theology. 54 (1): 51–69. doi:10.1017/S0036930600051188.
- Meredith, Anthony (1995). The Cappadocians. Crestwood, NY: St. Vladimir's Seminary Press. ISBN 0-88141-112-4.
- Mateo-Seco, Lucas Francisco; Maspero, Giulio, eds. (2010). The Brill Dictionary of Gregory of Nyssa. Leiden: Brill.
