= Gregory of Corinth =

Byzantine writer, grammarian and clergyman

Gregory of Corinth (Greek: Γρηγόριος Κορίνθιος), born George Pardos (Γεώργιος Πάρδος; c. 1070 – 1156), was a Byzantine Greek writer, grammarian and clergyman who served as the metropolitan of Corinth from 1092.

His family was established in the region of Corinth. Before his elevation to the episcopate, he served as professor at the Patriarchal School of Constantinople. He was the author of the following works on rhetoric and grammar:

- A treatise on the dialects of Ancient Greek (Περὶ διαλέκτων), the oldest surviving edition of which was published in 1493 in Milan.
- A treatise on elementary grammar and syntax (Περὶ συντάξεως λόγου).
- A grammatical exposition on the hymns of Cosmas of Maiuma and John Damascene (Ἐξηγήσεις ἐις τοὺς κανόνας τῶν δεσποτικῶν ἐορτῶν).

A treatise on poetic tropes (Περὶ τροπῶν ποιητικῶν) sometimes ascribed to him is actually by Tryphon.

== Editions ==
- Fausto Montana (ed.), Gregorio di Corinto. Esegesi al canone giambico per la Pentecoste attribuito a Giovanni Damasceno (Greek text and Italian translation), Biblioteca di studi antichi 76, Pise, Giardini Editori e Stampatori, 1995.
- Daniel Donnet (ed.), Le traité Περὶ συντάξεως λόγου de Grégoire de Corinthe. Étude de la tradition manuscrite (Greek text, French translation and commentary), Études de philologie, d'archéologie et d'histoire anciennes t. X, Institut historique belge de Rome, Bruxelles et Rome, 1967.
- Gottfried Heinrich Schæfer (ed.), Gregorii Corinthii et aliorum grammaticorum libri de dialectis linguæ Græcæ, Leipzig, Weigel, 1811.
- Ernst Christian Walz (ed.), Rhetores Græci, 9 vol., Tübingen, Cotta, 1832-36 (vol. VII).
