= Mariangelo Accorso =

Italian writer

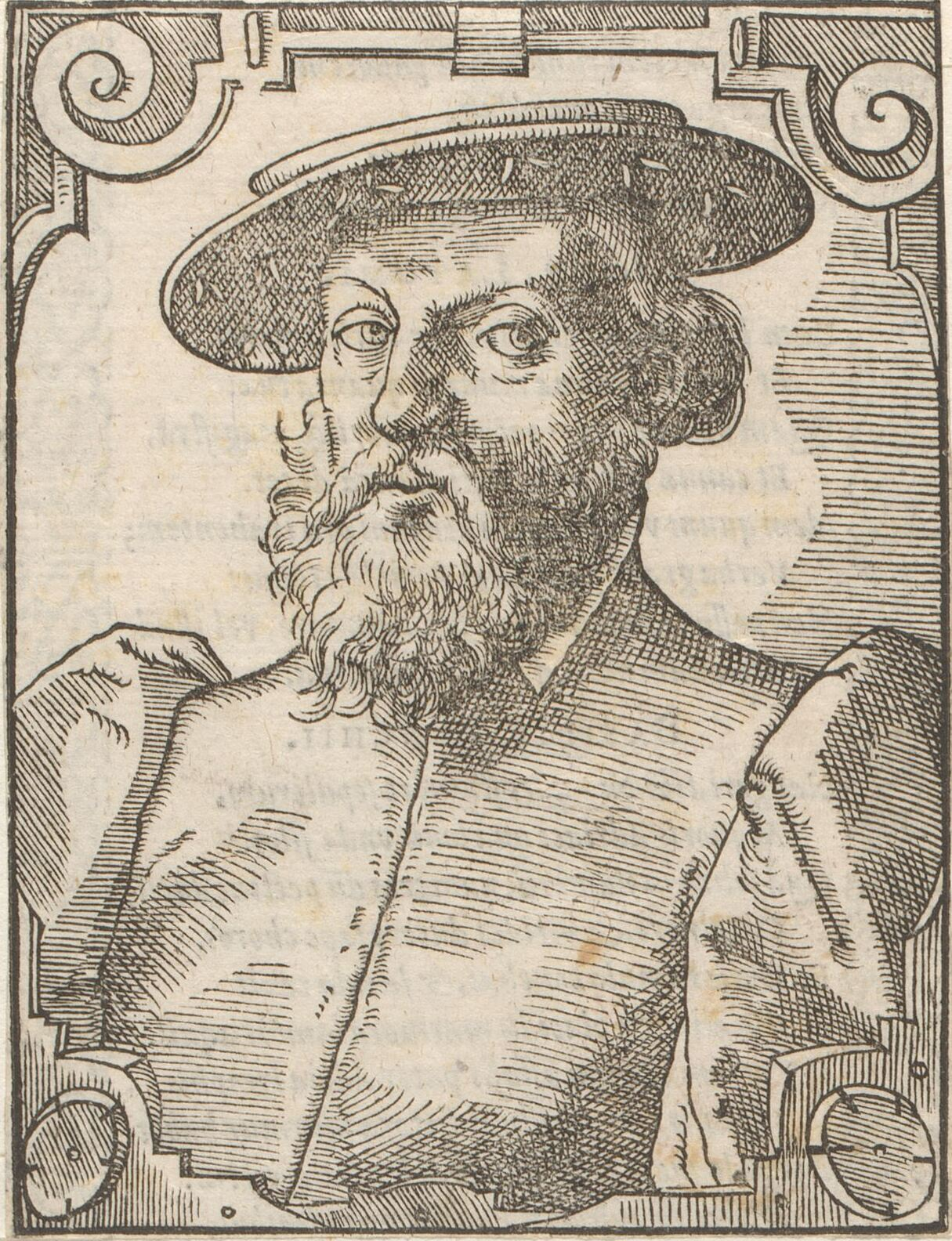
Engraved portrait of Mariangelo Accorso by Tobias Stimmer

Mariangelo Accorso or Accursio (Latin: Mariangelus Accursius; 1489 or 1490 – 1544 or 1546) was an Italian writer and critic.

== Biography ==
He was born at L'Aquila (Abruzzo), then part of the Kingdom of Naples.

He was a great favourite with Charles V, at whose court he resided for thirty-three years, and by whom he was employed on various foreign missions. To a perfect knowledge of Greek and Latin he added an intimate acquaintance with several modern languages. In discovering and collating ancient manuscripts, for which his travels abroad gave him special opportunities, he displayed uncommon diligence. His work entitled Diatribae in Ausonium, Solinum et Ovidium (1524) is a monument of erudition and critical skill. He was the first editor of the Letters of Cassiodorus, with his Treatise on the Soul (1538); and his edition of Ammianus Marcellinus (1533) contains five books more than any former one. The affected use of antiquated terms, introduced by some of the Latin writers of that age, is humorously ridiculed by him, in a dialogue in which an Oscan, a Volscian and a Roman are introduced as interlocutors (1531). Accorso was accused of plagiarism in his notes on Ausonius, a charge which he most solemnly and energetically repudiated.

== Works ==
- Osco, Volsco Romanaque eloquentia interlocutoribus, dialogus ludis Romanis actus. Published probably in Rome, according to some E. Guillery, in 1513, to others by J. Beplin in 1515.
- Diatribae. Published probably in Rome; Latin detail is "Romae: in aedibus Marcelli Argentei, octauo Kalendas Aprilis 25 III, 1524.
- Ammianus Marcellinus a Mariangelo Accursio mendis quinque millibus purgatus, atque libris quinque auctus ultimis, nunc primum ab eodem inuentis, Augustae Vindelicorum: in aedibus Silwani Otmar, May 1533.
- Magni Aurelii Cassiodori Variarum Libri XII. Item De anima liber unus. Recens inventi, & in lucem dati a Mariangelo Accursio, Augustae Vindelic.: Ex. aedibus Henrici Silicei, May 1533.
- Decimi Magni Ausonii Burdigalensis Opera, Iacobus Tollius, M.D. recensuit, et integris Scaligeri, Mariang. Accursii, Freheri, Scriverii; selectis Vineti, Barthii, Acidalii, Gronovii, Graevii, aliorumque notis accuratissime digestis, nec non & suis adimadversionibus illustravit, Amsterdam: apud Ioannem Blaeu, 1671.
