= American Carpatho-Russian Orthodox Diocese =

Diocese of the Ecumenical Patriarchate

Coordinates: 40°20′59″N 78°56′47″W

American Carpatho-Russian Orthodox Diocese of North America
- Abbreviation: ACROD
- Classification: Christianity
- Orientation: Eastern Orthodox Christianity
- Scripture: Septuagint, New Testament
- Theology: Eastern Orthodox theology
- Polity: Episcopal
- Ecumenical Patriarch: Bartholomew I of Constantinople
- Metropolitan: Gregory (Tatsis), Metropolitan of Nyssa
- Language: Ruthenian, English
- Liturgy: Byzantine Prostopinije chant
- Territory: United States; Canada
- Recognition: 1938 (Ecumenical Patriarchate of Constantinople)
- Members: 7,156 adherents in US (2020)
- Official website: https://www.acrod.org/

The American Carpatho-Russian Orthodox Diocese of North America (ACROD) is a diocese of the Ecumenical Patriarchate in the United States and Canada founded by converts from the Ruthenian Greek Catholic Church following the priest and inaugural Metropolitan Orestes Chornock. Though the diocese is directly responsible to the Patriarchate, it is under the spiritual supervision of the Primate of the Greek Orthodox Archdiocese of America. As of 2020, there are 77 parishes with 7,156 adherents, of which 3,621 regularly attend in the United States, but the diocese does not have monasteries. The diocese was led by Metropolitan Nicholas (Smisko) of Amissos (1936–2011). The current leader is the titular Metropolitan of Nyssa, Gregory (Tatsis), who was consecrated on November 27, 2012.

== History ==
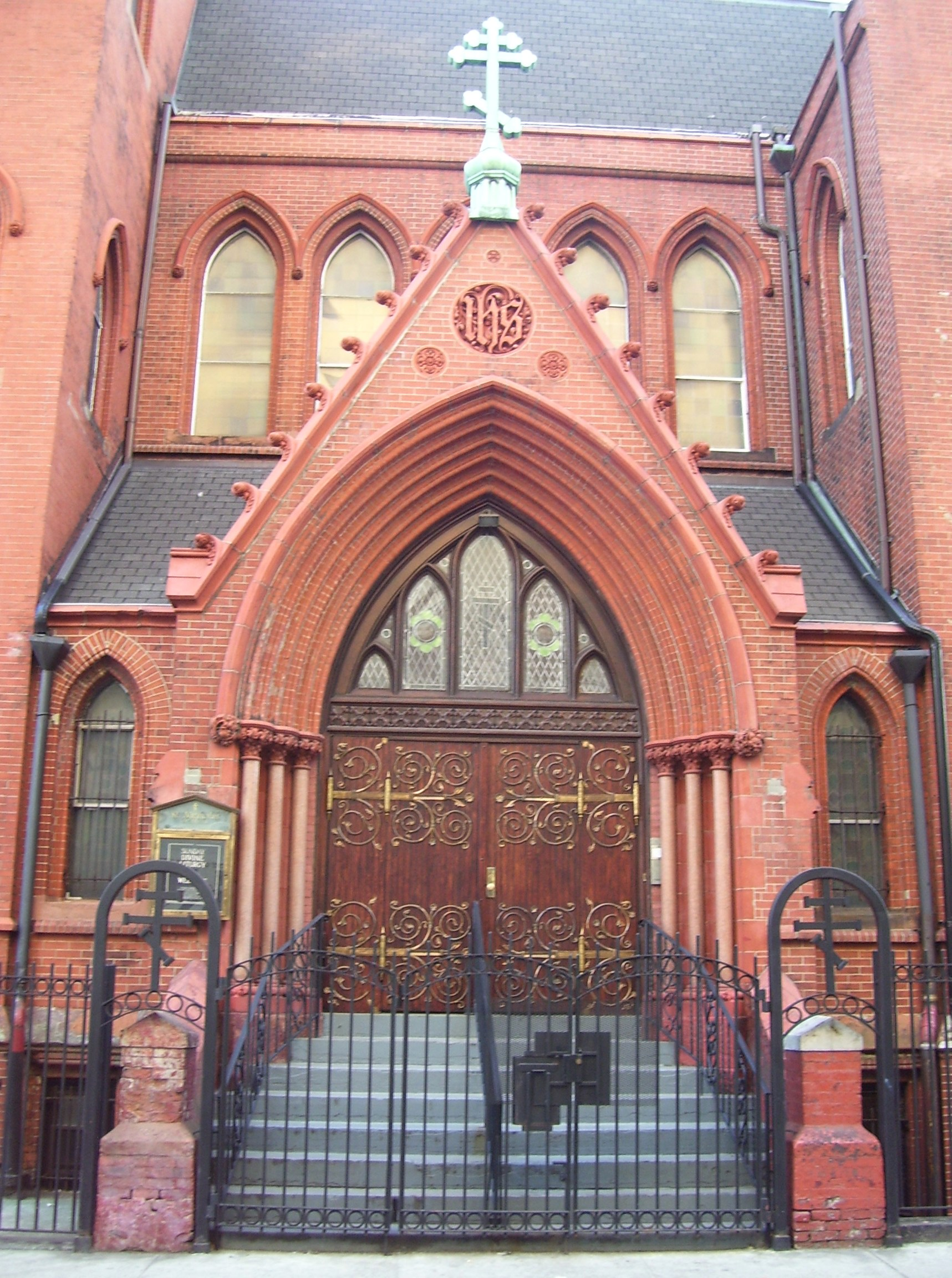
The entrance to the Church of St. Nicholas of Myra in the East Village of Manhattan, New York City, designed by James Renwick Jr. and W. H. Russell in 1883 as a chapel for St. Mark's Church in-the-Bowery but now part of the ACROD.

At the end of the nineteenth century, many East Slavs immigrated to North America. They were mostly Christians, some of them belonging to Eastern Orthodoxy, while others were Eastern Catholics of the Byzantine Rite. In Catholic terminology, East-Slavic form of the Byzantine Rite was known as the Ruthenian Rite, and thus the same Ruthenian designation was applied to East Slavs of that rite.

At that time, there were no Eastern Catholic jurisdictions in North America, and thus the first Eastern Catholic parishes were formed under jurisdiction of local Catholic bishops of the Latin Church. The Roman Catholic hierarchs, mostly Irish and Polish, however, did not readily welcome Eastern Catholics of the Ruthenian Rite, fearing the "scandal" that the presence of married priests would have on their own flock.

Treatment of the Eastern Catholics of the Byzantine Rite by the bishops of the predominant Latin Rite Catholics, especially regarding a married priesthood and the form of the Divine Liturgy or Mass, led some of them out of Catholicism and into the Eastern Orthodox Church. A particularly strident opponent of non-Latin practices was John Ireland the Archbishop of St. Paul, Minnesota from 1888 to 1918, who refused to permit Eastern Catholic clergy to function in his archdiocese.

The diocese was founded in 1938 when a group of 37 Ruthenian Eastern Catholic parishes, under the leadership of Fr. Orestes Chornock, were received into the jurisdiction of the Ecumenical Patriarchate. The year before, this group had officially renounced the Unia with the Holy See, primarily in protest over the Liturgical Latinisation occurring in their church life. A particularly divisive issue was the 1929 papal decree Cum data fuerit issued by Pope Pius XI which mandated that Eastern Rite clergy in the US were to be celibate.

This move actually marked the second North American group of Ruthenian-Rite Catholic parishes to move to Eastern Orthodoxy. The first had been led by Saint Alexis Toth of Wilkes-Barre into the jurisdiction of the Russian Metropolia in the 1890s. Notably, this second large-scale conversion to Eastern Orthodoxy by Ruthenian-Rite Catholics was directed toward Constantinople rather than to the Russian presence in North America.

This was primarily motivated out of concerns for preservation of a specific identity, since many among Ruthenian-Rite Catholics self-identified as Rusyns, and wanted to keep their distinctive identity, thus opposing Russification, which had occurred with the previous move. As such, rather than being absorbed into the body of Russian churches, and so being compelled to adopt Muscovite traditions, the ACROD was permitted by Constantinople to keep its distinctive Rusyn practices. Thus, the hymnography in the typical Ruthenian Prostopinije-chant and liturgical forms, including the particular form of Old Church Slavonic used in the divine services, were preserved, while certain Latin Rite practices, such as the addition of the Filioque clause to the Nicene Creed, were removed.

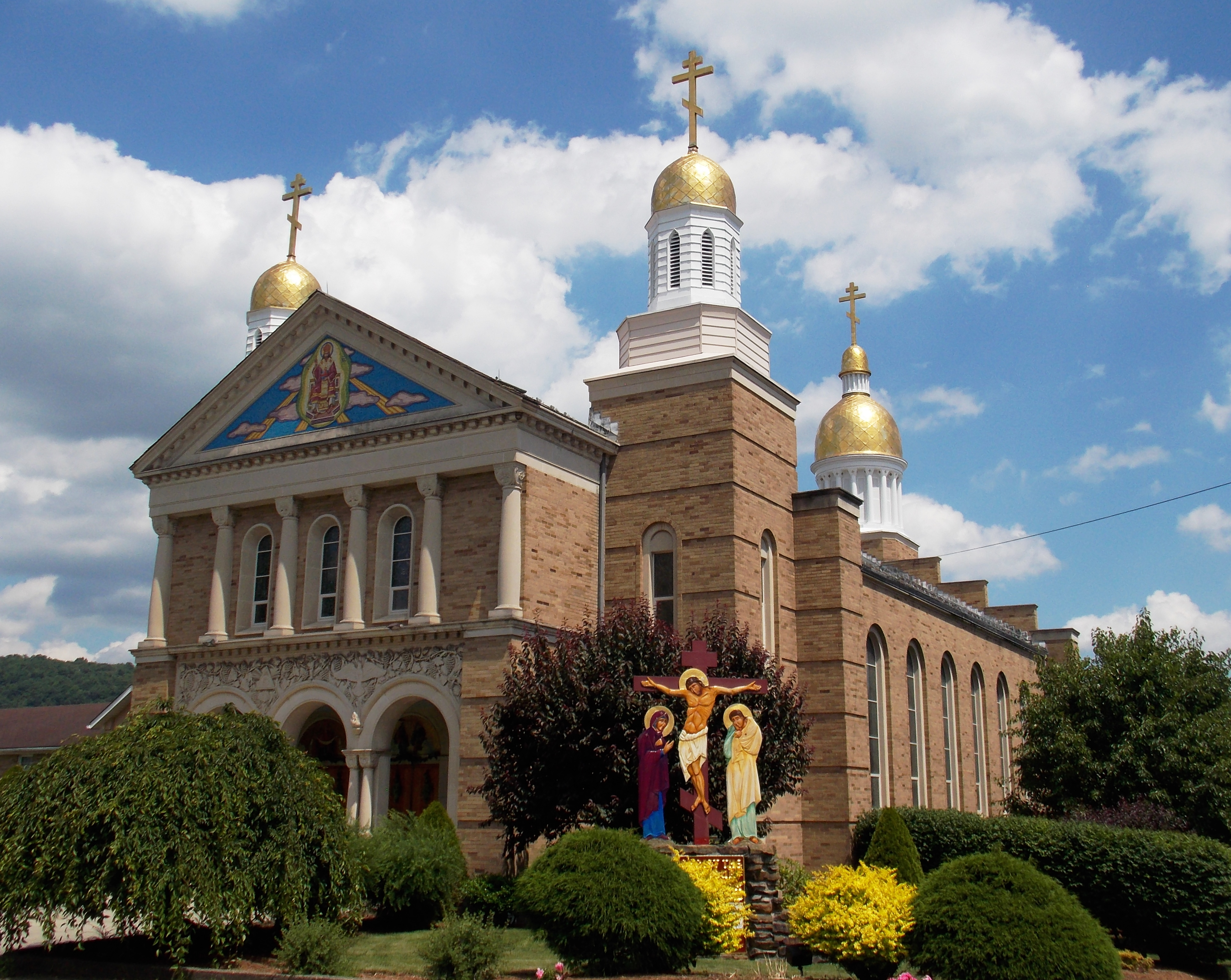
Christ the Saviour Cathedral in Johnstown, Pennsylvania

== Organization ==
In 2006, the ACROD had 14,372 members in 78 parishes and five missions. The bulk of the diocese's parishes are in 13 states in the eastern United States, with two parishes and two missions in Ontario; nearly half of the parishes are located in Pennsylvania. A map of the church on 2010 census data has been published.

There used to be two monasteries in the diocese: the Monastery of the Annunciation, in Tuxedo Park, New York which closed in the early 1990s, and the Monastery of the Holy Cross, at Beallsville, Maryland which dissolved in the late 1990s when its abbot converted to Ruthenian (Byzantine Rite) Catholicism.

The primate of the archdiocese is a member of the Assembly of Canonical Orthodox Bishops of the United States of America.

== Christ the Saviour Seminary ==
The Christ the Saviour Seminary is part of the diocese. It is located in Johnstown, Pennsylvania. The seminary was founded by the first bishop of the diocese, Orestes (Chornock), in 1940. The seminary, at first, not having a permanent home, moved and held classes in a number of northeastern United States cities, including New York City; Nicholson, Pennsylvania; and Bridgeport, Connecticut. In 1951, the diocese acquired the Strayer Mansion in Johnstown, Pennsylvania, that became the home of the seminary. The building has been developed to include class and lecture rooms and dining and recreation facilities, as well as a library and bookstore.

The main purpose of the seminary is to train priests for the ACROD and other Orthodox dioceses in the United States, as well as in foreign countries. The seminary places emphasis on pastorally-oriented training. It was approved in 1960 by the Pennsylvania State Council of Education to grant a Bachelor of Theology degree. The seminary has tailored curricula for five classifications of candidates: a three-year Bachelor of Theology program for students who already have baccalaureate degrees, a Licentiate of Theology diploma late vocations program for those without a previous undergraduate degree, and a special admissions program for individuals who do not intend to be ordained to the Orthodox clergy.

== Ruling bishops ==
- Orestes (Chornock) of Agathonikeia (1938–1977)
- John (Martin) of Nyssa (1977–1984)
- Nicholas (Smisko) of Amissos (1985–2011)
- Gregory (Tatsis) of Nyssa (2012–present)

== See also ==
- Assembly of Canonical Orthodox Bishops of the United States of America
- Assembly of Canonical Orthodox Bishops of Canada

== Sources ==
- Barriger, Lawrence (2000). Glory to Jesus Christ: A History of the American Carpatho-Russian Orthodox Diocese. Brookline, MA: Holy Cross Orthodox Press. ISBN 1885652445.
- Dyrud, Keith P. (1992). The Quest for the Rusyn Soul: The Politics of Religion and Culture in Eastern Europe and in America, 1890-World War I. Philadelphia: Balch Institute Press. ISBN 9780944190104.
- Krindatch, Alexei, ed. (2011). "American Carpatho-Russian Orthodox Diocese". Atlas of American Orthodox Christian churches (PDF). Orthodox Press. pp. 40–43. ISBN 978-1-935317-23-4.
- Magocsi, Paul R.; Pop, Ivan I., eds. (2005) [2002]. Encyclopedia of Rusyn History and Culture (2. rev. ed.). Toronto: University of Toronto Press.
- Magocsi, Paul R. (2015). With Their Backs to the Mountains: A History of Carpathian Rus' and Carpatho-Rusyns. Budapest-New York: Central European University Press. ISBN 9786155053467.
- Marti, Federico (2009). I rutheni negli Stati Uniti: Santa Sede e mobilità umana tra Ottocento e Novecento. Milano: Giuffrè. ISBN 9788814145902.
- Shipman, Andrew J. (1912a). "Ruthenian Rite". The Catholic Encyclopedia. Vol. 13. New York: Robert Appleton Company. pp. 276–277.
- Shipman, Andrew J. (1912b). "Ruthenians". The Catholic Encyclopedia. Vol. 13. New York: Robert Appleton Company. pp. 277–279.
