= List of editiones principes in Latin =

First printed editions of a manuscript

In classical scholarship, the editio princeps (plural: editiones principes) of a work is the first printed edition of the work, that previously had existed only in inscriptions or manuscripts, which could be circulated only after being copied by hand. The following is a list of Latin literature works.

== Latin works ==
=== 15th century ===
Date	Author, Work	Printer	Location	Comment
1453-1454	Aelius Donatus, ''Ars minor''	Johannes Gutenberg	Mainz or Strasbourg	This is the 27-line Donatus that only survives in fragments. Gutenberg made at least 24 impressions of this popular schoolbook; all of these editions have reached us incomplete. As yet, dating remains problematic. Albert Kapr believes the first printed 27-line Donatus were made in Strasbourg in the late 1440s, while the last in Mainz.
c. 1454	Biblia Vulgata	Johannes Gutenberg	Mainz	This is the well-known 42-line Bible, a major venture that was started in 1451. Undated, Gutenberg and his associate Johann Fust first promoted the results of their job in Frankfurt in October 1454 and cardinal Enea Silvio Piccolomini attested in March 1455 that either 158 or 180 bibles had been completed.
1465	Cicero, De Officiis and Paradoxa Stoicorum	Johann Fust	Mainz	Ulrich Zell may have printed earlier the De Officiis in Cologne (but not the Paradoxa); but the Cologne edition does not bear any indication of date.
1465	Cicero, De Oratore	Conradus Sweynheym and Arnoldus Pannartz	Subiaco	This edition was published without date but it is believed to be before September 1465.
1465	Lactantius, ''De opificio Dei'', Divinae Institutiones and De ira Dei	Conradus Sweynheym and Arnoldus Pannartz	Subiaco	
c. 1465	Augustinus, De doctrina christiana	Johannes Mentelin	Strasbourg	This is thought to be the first edition of any of Augustine's works. The volume is incomplete as it has only the last of the four books that make up De doctrina christiana; the remaining three books were printed by Kaspar Hochfeder in Kraków in 1475.
1465–1470	Augustinus, Confessiones	Johannes Mentelin	Strasbourg	
1466	Rabanus Maurus, ''De rerum naturis''	Adolf Rusch	Strasbourg	
1466-1468	Hieronymus, Epistulae and De viris illustribus, Contra Rufinum, Altercatio Luciferiani et Orthodoxi et Adversus Iovinianum	Sixtus Riessinger	Rome	Sine nomine, sine data and sine loco, this compilation in two volumes of Jerome's works was edited by Theodorus Laelius. Titled Epistolae et tractus, 131 of Jerome's 154 surviving letters are collected here together with 24 of his tracts and excluding only his biblical commentaries. The issue of the editio princeps remains open due to this imprint being undated; thus the 1468 Roman edition of the Epistulae printed by Sweynheym and Pannartz and edited by Joannes Andreas is also considered a possible first edition. This edition shares Riessinger's structure and tracts since this too is based on Laelius' efforts. In both printings Rufinus' Expositio is misattributed to Jerome. Two of the very few differences between these texts are represented by Gennadius and the Epistula Aristeae, available in Riessinger but not in Pannartz and Sweynheim.
1466-1468	Rufinus Aquileiensis, Expositio symboli, Apologia ad Anastasium, Apologia contra Hieronymum	Sixtus Riessinger	Rome	
1466-1468	Origenes, Libri X in Canticum canticorum and In Canticum canticorum homiliae II	Sixtus Riessinger	Rome	
1466-1468	Gennadius Massiliensis, De viris illustribus	Sixtus Riessinger	Rome	
1466-1468	Augustinus, De pastoribus	Sixtus Riessinger	Rome	
1467	Augustinus, De Civitate Dei	Conradus Sweynheym and Arnoldus Pannartz	Subiaco	
1467	Cicero, Ad familiares	Conradus Sweynheym and Arnoldus Pannartz	Rome	Sweynheym and Pannartz reprinted it in 1469; Johannes de Spira published a new edition in 1469 in Venice.
1467	Cicero, De senectute and De amicitia	Ulrich Zell	Cologne	
1467–1469	Juvenalis, Saturae	Udalricus Gallus	Rome	
1467-1468	Gregorius Magnus, Moralia in Job	Berthold Ruppel	Basel	Undated, it may be earlier than 1468, but not later.
1468	Institutiones	Peter Schöffer	Mainz	
1468	Ps.-Lactantius, De ave phoenice	Conradus Sweynheym and Arnoldus Pannartz	Rome	This is the second edition of Lactantius' works; Venantius Fortunatus' De Pascha is here due to its wrong attribution to Lactantius.
1468	Venantius Fortunatus, Carmen de Pascha	Conradus Sweynheym and Arnoldus Pannartz	Rome	This is the second edition of Lactantius' works; Venantius Fortunatus' De Pascha is here due to its wrong attribution to Lactantius.
1468	Pseudo-Matthaei evangelium	Arnoldus Pannartz and Conradus Sweynheym	Rome	Only parts of the text were edited by Joannes Andreas in his impression of Hieronymus' Epistolae. William Caxton in 1477 printed another edition which included the latter half and also the pars altera, a later addition to the gospel's narrative. The full text came out only in 1832, when Johann Karl Thilo edited it for his collection Codex apocryphus Novi Testamenti.
1468-1470	Rufius Festus, ''Breviarium''	Sixtus Riessinger	Rome or Naples	Riessinger's edition of the 'De viris illustribus omits 9 lives (Caesar, Octavianus, Cato, Cicero, Brutus, Sextus Pompeius, Marcus Antonius, Cleopatra); these were first published by Andreas Schottus in 1577.
1468-1470	Ps.-Aurelius Victor, De viris illustribus	Sixtus Riessinger	Rome or Naples	Riessinger's edition of the 'De viris illustribus omits 9 lives (Caesar, Octavianus, Cato, Cicero, Brutus, Sextus Pompeius, Marcus Antonius, Cleopatra); these were first published by Andreas Schottus in 1577.
1469	Cicero, Brutus and Orator	Conradus Sweynheym and Arnoldus Pannartz	Rome	Printed together with the De Oratore.
1469	Apuleius	Conradus Sweynheym and Arnoldus Pannartz	Rome	Edited by Joannes Andreas Together with Apuleius' works, this edition contains the spurious Asclepius and a Latin translation of Epitome disciplinarum Platonis by Alcinous.
1469	Ps.-Apuleius, Asclepius	Conradus Sweynheym and Arnoldus Pannartz	Rome	Edited by Joannes Andreas Together with Apuleius' works, this edition contains the spurious Asclepius and a Latin translation of Epitome disciplinarum Platonis by Alcinous.
1469	Livius, Ab Urbe condita	Conradus Sweynheym and Arnoldus Pannartz	Rome	Edited by Joannes Andreas. The Rome edition included only Books 1–10, 21–32, 34–39 and a portion of 40. In a 1518 Mainz edition, the rest of Book 40 and part of 33 were published, while in a 1531 Basel edition, Books 41-45 were published, edited by Simon Grynaeus. He had discovered the only surviving manuscript of the fifth decade in 1527 while searching in the Lorsch Abbey in Germany. In 1616 the remaining part of Book 33 was published in Rome, by which all extant Livy had reached print.
1469	Periochae	Conradus Sweynheym and Arnoldus Pannartz	Rome	Edited by Joannes Andreas. The Rome edition included only Books 1–10, 21–32, 34–39 and a portion of 40. In a 1518 Mainz edition, the rest of Book 40 and part of 33 were published, while in a 1531 Basel edition, Books 41-45 were published, edited by Simon Grynaeus. He had discovered the only surviving manuscript of the fifth decade in 1527 while searching in the Lorsch Abbey in Germany. In 1616 the remaining part of Book 33 was published in Rome, by which all extant Livy had reached print.
1469	Lucanus, Pharsalia	Conradus Sweynheym and Arnoldus Pannartz	Rome	Edited by Joannes Andreas.
1469	Vergilius, Aeneis, Georgica and Bucolica	Conradus Sweynheym and Arnoldus Pannartz	Rome	Edited by Joannes Andreas. Together with the three standard Virgilian works, Bussi included Donatus' Vita Vergilii. He also included a selection of the Priapeia and five poems from the Appendix Vergiliana, such as the Catalepton, Aetna and Ciris. The missing pieces were added to the Priapeia and Appendix by Bussi in 1471 when he made a second Roman edition of Virgil's works.
1469	Priapeia	Conradus Sweynheym and Arnoldus Pannartz	Rome	Edited by Joannes Andreas. Together with the three standard Virgilian works, Bussi included Donatus' Vita Vergilii. He also included a selection of the Priapeia and five poems from the Appendix Vergiliana, such as the Catalepton, Aetna and Ciris. The missing pieces were added to the Priapeia and Appendix by Bussi in 1471 when he made a second Roman edition of Virgil's works.
1469	Appendix Vergiliana	Conradus Sweynheym and Arnoldus Pannartz	Rome	Edited by Joannes Andreas. Together with the three standard Virgilian works, Bussi included Donatus' Vita Vergilii. He also included a selection of the Priapeia and five poems from the Appendix Vergiliana, such as the Catalepton, Aetna and Ciris. The missing pieces were added to the Priapeia and Appendix by Bussi in 1471 when he made a second Roman edition of Virgil's works.
1469	Aelius Donatus, Vita Vergilii	Conradus Sweynheym and Arnoldus Pannartz	Rome	Edited by Joannes Andreas. Together with the three standard Virgilian works, Bussi included Donatus' Vita Vergilii. He also included a selection of the Priapeia and five poems from the Appendix Vergiliana, such as the Catalepton, Aetna and Ciris. The missing pieces were added to the Priapeia and Appendix by Bussi in 1471 when he made a second Roman edition of Virgil's works.
1469	Julius Caesar, Commentarii de Bello Gallico and Commentarii de Bello Civili	Conradus Sweynheym and Arnoldus Pannartz	Rome	Edited by Joannes Andreas.
1469	De Bello Hispaniensi	Conradus Sweynheym and Arnoldus Pannartz	Rome	Edited by Joannes Andreas.
1469	De Bello Alexandrino	Conradus Sweynheym and Arnoldus Pannartz	Rome	Edited by Joannes Andreas.
1469	De Bello Africo	Conradus Sweynheym and Arnoldus Pannartz	Rome	Edited by Joannes Andreas.
1469	Plinius Maior, Naturalis historia	Johannes de Spira	Venice	
1469	Cicero, Tusculanae Disputationes	Udalricus Gallus	Rome	
1469	Aulus Gellius, ''Noctes Atticae''	Conradus Sweynheym and Arnoldus Pannartz	Rome	Edited by Joannes Andreas.
1469-1470	Terentius, Comoediae	Johannes Mentelin	Strasbourg	This is disputed, as others believe that the Venetian edition printed by Vindelinus de Spira may come first.
1469–1470	Persius, ''Saturae''	Udalricus Gallus	Rome	
c. 1470	Valerius Maximus, Facta et dicta memorabilia	Johannes Mentelin	Strasbourg	Not after 1470.
c. 1470	Isidorus Hispalensis, ''Sententiae''	Johannes Sensenschmidt	Nuremberg	Undated, it was not printed after April 1470.
c. 1470	Isidorus Hispalensis, ''De Fide Catholica contra Iudaeos''	Georgius Herolt	Rome	
c. 1470	Ambrosius, ''De officiis''	Ulrich Zell	Cologne	
1470	Priscianus Caesariensis	Vindelinus de Spira	Venice	Edited by Benedictus Prunulus.
1470	Rufinus Antiochensis, Commentaria in metra Terentiana and De compositione et de numeris oratorum	Vindelinus de Spira	Venice	Edited by Benedictus Prunulus.
c. 1470	Statius, Thebais and Achilleis		Rome	
1470	Augustinus, Sermones	Ulrich Zell	Cologne	This edition is made of 50 sermons. The first large scale edition came out in Basel in 1494 by Johann Amerbach, who gathered together for the first time most of the augustinian medieval collections of sermons. In 1564 Jean Vlimmerius published in Leuven for the first time a further 42 sermons; later on in Paris in 1631 Jacques Sirmond and in 1654 Jérôme Vignier made further additions. The complete works of Augustine by the Maurists were printed in 1683: 394 sermons, of which 364 are believed to be Augustinian; further discoveries have added 175 sermons to these. Among the main recent discoveries, Germain Morin in 1917 added 34 sermons, from the Codex Guelferbytani; Dom André Wilmart in 1921–1930 added 15 sermons from the Codex Wilmart; Dom Cyrille Lambot found 24 new sermons, seven in fragments, in the Codex Lambot. The last major discovery was made in 1990, when François Dolbeau discovered in Mainz a manuscript with 26 sermons.
c. 1470	Cicero, Philippicae	Udalricus Gallus	Rome	Edited by Johannes Antonius Campanus.
c. 1470	Cicero, De finibus	Ulrich Zell	Cologne	
c. 1470	Gregorius Magnus, Regula Pastoralis	Ulrich Zell	Cologne	
c. 1470	Cicero, De Legibus		Venice	According to others, the editio princeps is instead the one printed in 1471 in Rome by Pannartz and Sweynheim.
1470	Cicero, Somnium Scipionis	Vindelinus de Spira	Venice	Printed in an impression that included also De officiis, De amicitia, Paradoxa and De senectute.
1470	Sallustius, Bellum Catilinae and Bellum Iugurthinum	Vindelinus de Spira	Venice	
1470	Suetonius, De Vita Caesarum	Johannes Philippus de Lignamine	Rome	Edited by Johannes Antonius Campanus.
1470	Quintilianus, Institutio Oratoria	Johannes Philippus de Lignamine	Rome	Edited by Johannes Antonius Campanus.
1470	Cicero, De Inventione	Nicolaus Jenson	Venice	Edited by Omnibonus Leonicenus.
1470	Rhetorica ad Herennium	Nicolaus Jenson	Venice	Edited by Omnibonus Leonicenus.
c. 1470	Servius, Commentarii in Vergilii opera	Udalricus Gallus	Rome	
1470	Justinus, Epitoma Historiarum Philippicarum	Nicolaus Jenson	Venice	
1470	Cicero, Epistulae ad Brutum, Epistulae ad Quintum fratrem, and Epistulae ad Atticum	Nicolaus Jenson	Venice	There are good chances that this publication is preceded by the edition in the same year of Cicero's letters printed in Rome by Sweynheym and Pannartz and edited by Joannes Andreas. Thus, they are generally considered both editiones principes.
1470	Cornelius Nepos, Vita Attici	Nicolaus Jenson	Venice	There are good chances that this publication is preceded by the edition in the same year of Cicero's letters printed in Rome by Sweynheym and Pannartz and edited by Joannes Andreas. Thus, they are generally considered both editiones principes.
c. 1470	Disticha Catonis	Printer of the Speculum	Utrecht	Sine loco et anno, so both the year and place of impression are uncertain.
c. 1470	Tacitus, Historiae, Annales, Germania and Dialogus	Vindelinus de Spira	Venice	This edition only has books 11–16 of the Annales. Books 1–6 were rediscovered in 1508 in the Corvey Abbey (now in Germany) and brought to Rome. There they were printed by Étienne Guillery in 1515 together with the other books of the Annales while the edition was prepared by Philippus Beroaldus.
1470	Leo Magnus, Sermones and Epistulae	Johannes Philippus de Lignamine	Rome	Undated. In the same year Sweynheym and Pannartz printed in Rome an edition of the same writer, so there is some ambiguity regarding which came first. In either case, Joannes Andreas was the editor of both volumes. Both the editions are incomplete as they present 92 of Leo's 96 extant sermons and just 5 of his 173 surviving letters.
c. 1470	Ilias Latina		Utrecht	The undated Dutch edition only printed excerpts for a total of 500 of the 1070 lines that compose the Ilias Latina in a volume titled Speculum Meonii homeri greci poetarum maximi opus insigne cui yliada titulus inscribitur e greco in latinum versa. The first complete edition was instead printed by Filippo di Pietro in Venice in c. 1476.
1470	Pamphilus Caesariensis, Apologia pro Origene	Petrus Schoeffer	Mainz	Available in an edition of Jerome's works.
1470	Rufinus Aquileiensis, De adulteratione librorum Origenis	Petrus Schoeffer	Mainz	Available in an edition of Jerome's works.
1470-1471	Horatius	Printer of the Basilius	Venice	
1470–1471	Curtius Rufus, Historiae Alexandri Magni	Vindelinus de Spira	Venice	
1470–1471	Isidorus Hispalensis, ''Synonyma''	Johannes Sensenchmidt	Nuremberg	
1470-1471	Martinus Bracarensis, ''Formula vitae honestae''	Printer of the Historia S. Albani	Cologne	
1470-1471	Ps.-Seneca, De moribus, De remediis fortuitorum and Proverbia Senecae	Printer of the Historia S. Albani	Cologne	
1470–1475	Ps.-Dictys Cretensis, ''Ephemeris belli Troiani''	Ulrich Zell	Cologne	An ancient Latin translation made by Lucius Septimius of a lost Greek original.
1470-1475	Nonius Marcellus, ''De compendiosa doctrina''	Georgius Lauer	Rome	Edited by Julius Pomponius Laetus. An undated edition, the year of print is much debated: often attributed to c. 1470, it has been countered that the printing types used do not precede 1474. Apart from this the text presented is incomplete, as it lacks Book III of De compendiosa doctrina, a lacuna that was repeated in the following Venetian edition printed by Nicolaus Jenson in 1476. This was first printed in 1511 in Pesaro and edited by Johannes Baptista Pius.
1471	Ps.-Sallustius, Invectiva in Ciceronem	Vindelinus de Spira	Venice	These two speeches were included by Vindelinus in his second edition of Sallust's works. The Venetian edition's priority is doubted as the real editio princeps for both texts may very well be the undated edition printed in Cologne in probably the same year. Differently from the Venice edition the Cologne edition does not include Catilina and Iugurtha.
1471	Ps.-Cicero, Invectiva in Sallustium	Vindelinus de Spira	Venice	These two speeches were included by Vindelinus in his second edition of Sallust's works. The Venetian edition's priority is doubted as the real editio princeps for both texts may very well be the undated edition printed in Cologne in probably the same year. Differently from the Venice edition the Cologne edition does not include Catilina and Iugurtha.
c. 1471	Augustinus, Epistulae	Johannes Mentelin	Strasbourg	
1471	Cicero, Orationes	Conradus Sweynheym and Arnoldus Pannartz	Rome	Edited by Joannes Andreas, a total of 56 speeches were printed.
1471	Cicero, De Natura Deorum, De Divinatione, Academica priora and Academica posteriora	Conradus Sweynheym and Arnoldus Pannartz	Rome	Edited by Joannes Andreas as an attempt to gather together Cicero's scripta philosophica. Thus the edition also includes De finibus, De senectute and Tusculanae disputationes.
1471	Cyprianus	Conradus Sweynheym and Arnoldus Pannartz	Rome	Edited by Joannes Andreas, this impression lacks the third book of Ad Quirinum; it was to be printed in c. 1477 in Deventer by Richardus Pafraet. Also, Cyprian's epistolary is here incomplete; three letters were added by Erasmus in 1520 and sixteen new letters were printed in 1563 in Rome by Paulus Manutius, together with two of Novatian's three extant letters. After Manutius, Guillaume Morel published another four letters in Paris in 1564.
1471	Ps.-Cyprianus, Quod idola dii non sint, De montibus Sina et Sion and De singularitate clericorum	Conradus Sweynheym and Arnoldus Pannartz	Rome	Edited by Joannes Andreas, this impression lacks the third book of Ad Quirinum; it was to be printed in c. 1477 in Deventer by Richardus Pafraet. Also, Cyprian's epistolary is here incomplete; three letters were added by Erasmus in 1520 and sixteen new letters were printed in 1563 in Rome by Paulus Manutius, together with two of Novatian's three extant letters. After Manutius, Guillaume Morel published another four letters in Paris in 1564.
1471	Novatianus, Epistulae	Conradus Sweynheym and Arnoldus Pannartz	Rome	Edited by Joannes Andreas, this impression lacks the third book of Ad Quirinum; it was to be printed in c. 1477 in Deventer by Richardus Pafraet. Also, Cyprian's epistolary is here incomplete; three letters were added by Erasmus in 1520 and sixteen new letters were printed in 1563 in Rome by Paulus Manutius, together with two of Novatian's three extant letters. After Manutius, Guillaume Morel published another four letters in Paris in 1564.
1471	Florus, ''Epitome rerum Romanarum''	Ulrich Gering, Michael Friburger and Martin Crantz	Paris	Edited by Robert Gaguin.
1471	Plinius Minor, Epistulae	Christophorus Valdarfer	Venice	Edited by Ludovico Carbone. The edition does not include all ten books of the Epistulae but only the first seven and the ninth, for a total of 122 letters of the currently existing 375. These were increased to 236 letters in nine books with the publication of the Roman edition in 1490. Still missing was the tenth book, found by Giovanni Giocondo between 1495 and 1500 in the Abbey of St. Victor near Paris. Giocondo made a transcription, as did briefly after another Italian, Pietro Leandro, who once returned from France gave his partial copy of the tenth book to Hieronymus Avantius who printed the new 46 letters in Verona in 1502. For an edition of all Pliny's letters it was necessary to wait 1508, when Aldus Manutius printed in Venice a complete edition taking advantage of the transcript and other Plinian manuscripts Giocondo had given him.
1471	Ovidius	Baldassarre Azzoguidi	Bologna	Edited by Franciscus Puteolanus. There is some dispute regarding the possibility Ovid's first opera omnia may have been preceded by the Roman edition printed by Sweynheym and Pannartz, which is without date but thought to be also from 1471, and this is true also for the pseudoovidian Nux.
1471	Ps.-Ovidius, Nux	Baldassarre Azzoguidi	Bologna	Edited by Franciscus Puteolanus. There is some dispute regarding the possibility Ovid's first opera omnia may have been preceded by the Roman edition printed by Sweynheym and Pannartz, which is without date but thought to be also from 1471, and this is true also for the pseudoovidian Nux.
1471	Ps.-Ovidius, Consolatio ad Liviam	Conradus Sweynheym and Arnoldus Pannartz	Rome	This poem is inserted in a volume of Ovid's works edited by Joannes Andreas.
1471	Eutropius, Breviarium	Georgius Lauer	Rome	
1471	Paulus Diaconus, Historia Romana	Georgius Lauer	Rome	
1471	Cornelius Nepos, Vitae Imperatorum	Nicolaus Jenson	Venice	
1471	Cicero, De fato	Vindelinus de Spira	Venice	Published together with De natura deorum, De divinatione, De legibus and the Academica under the title M. Tulli Ciceronis De natura deorum libri III, De divinatione libri II, De fato liber, De legibus libri III, Academicorum libri II. It may have been preceded by the Opera philosophica printed in the same year in Rome by Arnold Pannartz and Konrad Sweynheim.
c. 1471	Claudianus, De raptu Proserpinae	Christophorus Valdarfer	Venice	Being undated, it is not certain whether this is the editio princeps; others have proposed as first edition the incunable from printers Nicolaus Ketelaer and Gerardus de Leempt, which appears in Utrecht in 1473–1475, that also results to be undated.
1471	Orosius, Historiae adversum paganos	Johannes Schüssler	Augsburg	
1471	Pomponius Mela, De chorographia	Panfilo Castaldi	Milan	While the press was owned by Castaldi he seems to have had limited himself to an organizational role while the everyday activity was done by his associates Gabriele Orsoni and the brothers Fortunato and Antonius Zarotus.
1471	Martialis, Epigrammata	Andreas Gallicus	Ferrara	The priority issue is highly controversial. The Roman undated edition printed by Sweynheym and Pannartz circa 1470–1471 is often thought to be the editio princeps; also, there is a Venetian edition that is possibly the first printed edition. The Ferrara edition does not include the Liber de spectaculis, which is instead present in the Roman and Venetian incunables.
1471	Silius Italicus, Punica	Conradus Sweynheym and Arnoldus Pannartz	Rome	Edited by Joannes Andreas that published together Silius Italicus, Calpurnius and Hesiod. To this edition of the Punica 58 newly found lines were added by Jacobus Constantius in 1508.
1471	Calpurnius, Carmina bucolica	Conradus Sweynheym and Arnoldus Pannartz	Rome	Edited by Joannes Andreas that published together Silius Italicus, Calpurnius and Hesiod. To this edition of the Punica 58 newly found lines were added by Jacobus Constantius in 1508.
1471	Nemesianus, Carmina bucolica	Conradus Sweynheym and Arnoldus Pannartz	Rome	Edited by Joannes Andreas that published together Silius Italicus, Calpurnius and Hesiod. To this edition of the Punica 58 newly found lines were added by Jacobus Constantius in 1508.
1471	Ps.-Probus, Vita Vergilii	Conradus Sweynheym and Arnoldus Pannartz	Rome	Edited by Joannes Andreas as part of his second edition of Virgil's works.
c. 1471	Boethius, De Consolatione Philosophiae	Johannes Glim	Savigliano	Undated, others have suggested the incunable's date to be 1473 or 1474. This would probably make the editio princeps the lavish edition that came out in Nuremberg in 1473 from Anton Koberger's press, containing a commentary traditionally attributed to Thomas of Aquin and a German translation.
1471–1472	Aelius Donatus, ''Ars Maior''	Christophorus Valdarfer or Paulus Butzbach and Georgius de Augusta	Venice or Verona	Book III or De barbarismo had been previously printed separately by an unknown printer in Venice in c. 1471. There is much uncertainty regarding the printer: according to an interpretation it was made by Valdarfer in Venice, according to another by Paulus and Georgius in Verona.
1471-1472	Paulus Diaconus, Epitome Festi De verborum significatu	Georgius Lauer	Rome	Edited by Julius Pomponius Laetus.
1471–1472	Varro, De lingua latina	Georgius Lauer	Rome	Edited by Julius Pomponius Laetus
1472	Epiphanius Scholasticus, Historia ecclesiastica tripartita	Johannes Schüssler	Augsburg	
1472	Plautus, Comoediae	Johannes de Colonia	Venice	Edited by Georgius Merula basing himself on the Codex Ursinianus. With a dedication to Iacopo Zeno, bishop of Padua.
1472	Macrobius, In Somnium Scipionis and Saturnalia	Nicolaus Jenson	Venice	
1472	Cicero, Topica	Antonius Zarotus	Milan	
c. 1472	Gregorius Magnus, Registrum epistularum	Gunterius Zainer	Augsburg	
1472	Cato Maior, De agri cultura	Nicolaus Jenson	Venice	Edited by Georgius Merula and Francesco Colucia under the collective title Scriptores rei rusticae. Merula took care of the first three texts to which he also added three glossaries, one for each author; Colucia instead occupied himself with Palladius. While Palladius' edition contains the poem that represents the fifteenth book (De insitione), it lacks the fourteenth (De veterinaria medicina); this one was only found later and published by Josef Svennung in Gothenburg under the title Palladii Rutilii Tauri Aemiliani viri illustris Opus agriculturae - quartus decimus De veterinaria.
1472	Varro, De re rustica	Nicolaus Jenson	Venice	
1472	Columella, De re rustica	Nicolaus Jenson	Venice	
1472	Palladius, Opus agriculturae	Nicolaus Jenson	Venice	
1472	Lactantius, Epitome	Vindelinus de Spira	Venice	An abridgement of the Divinae Institutiones. The Venice edition of the Epitome is incomplete, the full text having been first published by Christoph Matthäus Pfaff in Paris in 1712.
1472	Catullus, Carmina	Vindelinus de Spira	Venice	The three poets were all published together for the first time in a quarto volume. In the volume was also Propertius. There is considerable debate if this is the Corpus Tibullianum's editio princeps; others have argued that an impression printed by Federicus de Comitibus in Venice the same year should be considered the first edition.
1472	Tibullus, Elegiae	Vindelinus de Spira	Venice	The three poets were all published together for the first time in a quarto volume. In the volume was also Propertius. There is considerable debate if this is the Corpus Tibullianum's editio princeps; others have argued that an impression printed by Federicus de Comitibus in Venice the same year should be considered the first edition.
1472	Appendix Tibulliana	Vindelinus de Spira	Venice	The three poets were all published together for the first time in a quarto volume. In the volume was also Propertius. There is considerable debate if this is the Corpus Tibullianum's editio princeps; others have argued that an impression printed by Federicus de Comitibus in Venice the same year should be considered the first edition.
1472	Statius, Silvae	Vindelinus de Spira	Venice	The three poets were all published together for the first time in a quarto volume. In the volume was also Propertius. There is considerable debate if this is the Corpus Tibullianum's editio princeps; others have argued that an impression printed by Federicus de Comitibus in Venice the same year should be considered the first edition.
1472	Propertius, Carmina	Federicus de Comitibus	Venice	This edition appeared in February and is thought to be probably the first, but the issue is controversial as another edition of Propertius printed by Vindelinus de Spira including Catullus, Tibullus and Statius also appeared in Venice in the same year.
1472	Isidorus Hispalensis, Etymologiae	Gunterius Zainer	Augsburg	The editio princeps is thought to be the first printed volume ever to show a mappa mundi.
1472	Isidorus Hispalensis, ''De natura rerum''	Gunterius Zainer	Augsburg	
1472	Cicero, Partitiones oratoriae	Antonius Zarotus	Milan	Edited by Gabriel Fontana.
c. 1472	Aelius Donatus, Commentum Terentii	Vindelinus de Spira	Venice	Edited by Raphael Zovenzonius. This volume may have been preceded by the first dated edition printed in Rome in 1472 by Sweynheym and Pannartz; otherwise, the editio princeps could alo possibly be an also undated and unnamed edition probably printed in Strasbourg by Johannes Mentelin between 1470 and 1472.
1472	Ausonius		Venice	Edited by Bartholomaeus Girardinus, the volume also contains poetry by Ovid, Calpurnius Siculus and Gregorius Tifernas. Ausonius' editio princeps is incomplete because it used a Z class manuscript, which represents the briefest of the surviving selections. The first additions came in 1490 in Milan when Julius Aemilius Ferrarius first added to the Ordo urbium nobilium. In 1499 Thaddaeus Ugoletus in Parma was able to use also a manuscript from the richer Y selection, adding for the first time among other works the Mosella, Signa caelestia and the Ludus septem sapientum. Further additions to the ausonian corpus were made by Hieronymus Avantius in 1507 in Venice who published the Praefatiunculae and other texts. Finally, a new manuscript permitted Stephanus Charpinus in Lyon in 1558 to make major contributions to the corpus, such as Ephemeris, Parentalia, Professores and De herediolo.
1472	Faltonia Proba, De laudibus Christi		Venice	
1472	Ambrosius, Hexaemeron	Johannes Schüssler	Augsburg	
1472-1473	Suetonius, De grammaticis et rhetoribus	Nicolaus Jenson	Venice	Undated, its position as princeps is contested by a 1474 Venetian edition and a 1478 Florentine one.
c. 1473	Lucretius, De rerum natura	Thomas Ferrandus	Brescia	
1473	Servius, Centimeter and De finalibus	Antonius Zarotus	Milan	These texts appear in this volume with other similar works, including Phocas' De orthographia.
1473	Beda, De metris and De schematibus tropis	Antonius Zarotus	Milan	These texts appear in this volume with other similar works, including Phocas' De orthographia.
1473	Maximus Victorinus, De ratione metrorum and De finalibus metrorum	Antonius Zarotus	Milan	These texts appear in this volume with other similar works, including Phocas' De orthographia.
1473	Ps.-Servius, De littera	Antonius Zarotus	Milan	These texts appear in this volume with other similar works, including Phocas' De orthographia.
1473	Phocas, De nomine et verbo	Antonius Zarotus	Milan	These texts appear in this volume with other similar works, including Phocas' De orthographia.
c. 1473	Sidonius Apollinaris	Nicolaus Ketelaer and Gerardus de Leempt	Utrecht	
c. 1473	Isidorus Hispalensis, Chronica	Johannes Philippus de Lignamine	Rome	An incomplete edition of the chronicle. A complete version of the text was first printed in Turin in 1593 and edited by Garcia de Loaisa.
c. 1473	Sedulius, Paschale Carmen	Nicolaus Ketelaer and Gerardus de Leempt	Utrecht	
1473	Gregorius Magnus, Homiliae in Evangelia	Gunterius Zainer	Augsburg	
1473	Solinus, Collectanea rerum memorabilium	Nicolaus Jenson	Venice	
c. 1473	Gregorius Magnus, Expositio in Canticis canticorum	Ulrich Zell	Cologne	1473 or not much later.
1473-1474	Prosper Aquitanus, Liber epigrammatum	Johannes Glim	Savigliano	
1473-1474	Vegetius, De Re Militari	Nicolaus Ketelaer and Gerardus de Leempt	Utrecht	
1473-1474	Marcus Manilius, Astronomica	Johannes Regiomontanus	Nuremberg	
1474	Ps.-Acro, Scholia in Horatium	Antonius Zarotus	Milan	In two volumes, the first having Horace's works and the second Pseudo-Acro's scholia.
c. 1474	Ps.-Lactantius, Narrationes fabularum Ovidianarum	Petrus Maufer	Padua	The printer misattributes the work to Aelius Donatus.
1474	Maximianus, Elegiae	Nicolaus Ketelaer and Gerardus de Leempt	Utrecht	Published under the title Maximianus. Ethica suavis et periocunda; Epitaphia; Epigrammata.
1474	Gaius Valerius Flaccus, Argonautica	Ugo Rugerius and Dionysius Bertochius	Bologna	
1474	Marius Victorinus, Explanationes in Ciceronis rhetoricam	Antonius Zarotus	Milan	
1474	Germanicus, Aratea	Ugo Rugerius and Dionysius Bertochius	Bologna	Together with Germanicus' translation of Aratus' Phaenomena the volume also contains Manilius' Astronomica.
c. 1474	Serenus Sammonicus, Liber medicinalis		Venice	
c. 1474	Augustinus, De Trinitate	Georg Reyser	Strasbourg	Printed not later than 1474.
c. 1474	Historia Apollonii regis Tyri	Nicolaus Ketelaer and Gerardus de Leempt	Utrecht	
1474	Ammianus Marcellinus, Res gestae	Georgius Sachsel and Bartholomaeus Golsch	Rome	Edited by Angelus Sabinus with a dedication to the humanist Niccolò Perotti. The edition is incomplete as it contains only the first 13 of the surviving 18 books. The unprinted books were published together with the others in 1533 in two different editions, one in Augsburg edited by Mariangelus Accursius and printed by Silvanus Otmar, the other in Basel edited by Sigismund Gelenius and printed by Hieronymus Froben.
1474	Paulinus Diaconus, Vita Ambrosii		Milan	
1474-1475	Pomponius Porphyrion, Commentum in Horatium Flaccum	Bartholomaeus Guldinbeck	Rome	Edited by Aelius Franciscus Marchisius with support from Angelus Sabinus, this volume includes Horace's lyrical poetry and his Ars poetica with scholia by both Porphyrion and Pseudo-Acro. In about 1481 in Treviso or Venice in an edition of Horace opera omnia all of Porphyrion's commentaries were edited by Raphael Regius.
1474-1476	Hieronymus, Chronicon	Philippus de Lavagna	Milan	Due to this edition being undated, the year of impression is highly controversial, with the scholar A. Ganda dating it as early as 1468. As for the editor it was Boninus Mombritius that also added Matteo Palmieri's continuation of Jerome and Prosper. It must also be added that this isn't Prosper's complete chronicle, since it extends only to year 442.
1474-1476	Prosper Aquitanus, Epitoma Chronicorum	Philippus de Lavagna	Milan	Due to this edition being undated, the year of impression is highly controversial, with the scholar A. Ganda dating it as early as 1468. As for the editor it was Boninus Mombritius that also added Matteo Palmieri's continuation of Jerome and Prosper. It must also be added that this isn't Prosper's complete chronicle, since it extends only to year 442.
1475	Codex Justinianus	Peter Schöffer	Mainz	This edition only contains the first nine books. The remaining three books were published by the same printer two years later, also in Mainz.
1475	Digesta	Vitus Puecher	Rome	Puecher only published the second part of the collection, the Digestum infortiatum. The first part (Digestum vetus) was printed the following year in Foligno by Henricus Clayn; the last part (Digestum novus) also in 1476 in Rome.
1475	Sallustius, Historiae and Epistulae ad Caesarem	Arnoldus Pannartz	Rome	
1475	Seneca Philosophus, Dialogi, De beneficiis, De Clementia and Epistulae morales ad Lucilium	Matthias Moravus	Naples	The first complete edition of Seneca's philosophical works. Due to a confusion between the son and the father the volume also includes Seneca the Elder's widely known epitomized version composed of excerpts from his Suasoriae et Controversiae; the complete surviving text was printed in 1490 in Venice by Bernardinus de Cremona together with the younger Seneca. Also in the edition is Publilius Syrus, whose Sententiae are in the so-called Proverbia Senecae. The mistake was corrected in 1514 by Erasmus when the latter published in Southwark in 1514 an edition of Publilius that is generally considered to be the real editio princeps. Erasmus was followed in Leipzig in 1550 by Georg Fabricius, who also added twenty new sentences to the print.
1475	Seneca Rhetor, Controversiae and Suasoriae	Matthias Moravus	Naples	
1475	Publilius Syrus, Sententiae	Matthias Moravus	Naples	
1475	Epistulae Pauli et Senecae	Matthias Moravus	Naples	
1475	Historia Augusta	Philippus de Lavagna	Milan	Edited by Bonus Accursius.
1475	Ps.-Quintilianus, Declamationes maiores	Johannes Schurener	Rome	Edited by Domitius Calderinus with a dedication to Aniello Arcamone, ambassador of the Kingdom of Naples to the Holy See. The edition only contained declamations 8, 9 and 10; the other declamations were published in Venice in 1481, edited by Jacobus Grasolarius with the help of Georgius Merula. These impressions may have been preceded by an undated and without place edition printed by Leonardus Achates.
1475	Hyginus, Poeticon astronomicon	Augustinus Carnerius	Ferrara	
1475	Johannes Scotus Eriugena, Vox spiritualis Aquilae	Bartholomaeus de Unkel	Cologne	This homily was misattributed here to Origen.
c. 1475	Beda, Historia Ecclesiastica gentis Anglorum	Heinrich Eggestein	Strasbourg	The edition is undated, but it is agreed to have been printed between 1474 and 1482.
1475	Boethius, Interpretatio Priorum analyticorum Aristotelis	Konrad Braem	Leuven	
1475	Hieronymus, Vitae Patrum	Jean Fabre	Caselle	
c. 1475	Diomedes Grammaticus, Ars grammatica	Nicolaus Jenson	Venice	Published together with grammatical works such as Priscian's Institutio de nomine et pronomine et verbo as well as others. Regarding the Commentarius, This edition does not offer the full text but only deals with the ''Ars minor'' and the second book of the ''Ars maior''. This shortcoming was healed in 1864 by Heinrich Keil who edited the near complete text for his series Grammatici Latini. Lacking was only most of the part treating the third book of the Ars maior, which was first published in 1975 by Ulrich Schindel in Göttingen.
c. 1475	Ps.-Caper, De orthographia	Nicolaus Jenson	Venice	
c. 1475	Agroecius, Ars de orthographia	Nicolaus Jenson	Venice	
c. 1475	Ps.-Servius, Commentarius in Artem Donati	Nicolaus Jenson	Venice	
1475-1477	Tacitus, Agricola	Franciscus Puteolanus	Milan	This is the renowned scholarly editio puteolana of Tacitus' works.
1475-1478	Lactantius Placidus, In Statii Thebaida commentum	Philippus de Lavagna	Milan	Edited by Boninus Mombritius.
1475–1478	Boethius, In Categorias Aristotelis and Commentaria in Porphirium	Sixtus Riessinger	Naples	These commentaries are present together with Boethius' translations from the Greek of Porphyry's Isagoge and of Aristotle's Categoriae.
c. 1475-1478	Venantius Fortunatus, Vita Sanctae Radegundis	Boninus Mombritius	Milan	A hagiographical compilation titled Sanctuarium sev vitae sanctorum. Only excerpts of Columbanus' life were printed here. A condensed version came out in London in 1516, included in a miscellany titled Nova Legenda Anglie. A complete version was made in Basel in 1563, where the work is misplaced under Bede's complete works.
c. 1475-1478	Jonas Bobiensis, Vita Columbani	Boninus Mombritius	Milan	A hagiographical compilation titled Sanctuarium sev vitae sanctorum. Only excerpts of Columbanus' life were printed here. A condensed version came out in London in 1516, included in a miscellany titled Nova Legenda Anglie. A complete version was made in Basel in 1563, where the work is misplaced under Bede's complete works.
c. 1475-1478	Passio Sancti Clementis	Boninus Mombritius	Milan	A hagiographical compilation titled Sanctuarium sev vitae sanctorum. Only excerpts of Columbanus' life were printed here. A condensed version came out in London in 1516, included in a miscellany titled Nova Legenda Anglie. A complete version was made in Basel in 1563, where the work is misplaced under Bede's complete works.
c. 1475-1478	Passio Fructuosi, Augurii et Eulogii	Boninus Mombritius	Milan	A hagiographical compilation titled Sanctuarium sev vitae sanctorum. Only excerpts of Columbanus' life were printed here. A condensed version came out in London in 1516, included in a miscellany titled Nova Legenda Anglie. A complete version was made in Basel in 1563, where the work is misplaced under Bede's complete works.
c. 1475-1478	Sulpicius Severus, Vita Martini, Dialogi and Epistulae	Boninus Mombritius	Milan	A hagiographical compilation titled Sanctuarium sev vitae sanctorum. Only excerpts of Columbanus' life were printed here. A condensed version came out in London in 1516, included in a miscellany titled Nova Legenda Anglie. A complete version was made in Basel in 1563, where the work is misplaced under Bede's complete works.
c. 1475-1478	Eucherius Lugdunensis, Passio martyrum Acaunensium	Boninus Mombritius	Milan	A hagiographical compilation titled Sanctuarium sev vitae sanctorum. Only excerpts of Columbanus' life were printed here. A condensed version came out in London in 1516, included in a miscellany titled Nova Legenda Anglie. A complete version was made in Basel in 1563, where the work is misplaced under Bede's complete works.
1476	Authenticum		Rome	
1476–1477	Avianus, Fabulae	Gunterius Zainer	Ulm	Edited by Heinrich Steinhowel, it only contains 27 of Avianus' fables.
1476-1478	Johannes Cassianus, Collationes	Brethren of the Common Life	Brussels	
1476-1478	Corpus Juris Civilis	Jacobus Rubeus	Venice	Published in six volumes, this was the first edition to print together all parts of the Corpus.
1477	Asconius Pedianus, Commentarii in orationes Ciceronis	Johannes de Colonia and Johannes Manthen	Venice	Edited by Hieronymus Squarzaficus.
1477	Ps.-Asconius Pedianus, Commentarii in Verrinas	Johannes de Colonia and Johannes Manthen	Venice	Edited by Hieronymus Squarzaficus.
c. 1477	Ps.-Cyprianus, Ad Novatianum and Orationes ii	Richardus Pafraet	Deventer	A new edition of Cyprian's works, Novatian's text and Ad Novatianum are there due to a misattribution to Cyprian.
c. 1477	Novatianus, De bono pudicitiae	Richardus Pafraet	Deventer	A new edition of Cyprian's works, Novatian's text and Ad Novatianum are there due to a misattribution to Cyprian.
1478	Aulus Cornelius Celsus, De Medicina	Nicolaus Laurentii	Florence	Edited by Bartolomeo della Fonte with a dedication to the humanist and banker Francesco Sassetti.
1479	Alcuinus, De dialectica		Florence	Erroneously published as a work by Augustine under the title Logica Beati Augustini.
c. 1481	Ps.-Apuleius, Herbarium Apuleii Platonici	Johannes Philippus de Lignamine	Rome	The book is dedicated to the Cardinal Francesco Gonzaga. It is undated, but was printed between 1478 and 1482. The De herba vettonica is presented mistakenly in this edition as the first chapter of the Herbarium. Always concerning the De herba vettonica the introductory letter Epistula ad M. Agrippam is absent. This was first printed in Zürich in 1537, edited by Gabriel Humelberg and printed by Christoph Froschauer.
c. 1481	Ps.-Antonius Musa, De herba vettonica	Johannes Philippus de Lignamine	Rome	The book is dedicated to the Cardinal Francesco Gonzaga. It is undated, but was printed between 1478 and 1482. The De herba vettonica is presented mistakenly in this edition as the first chapter of the Herbarium. Always concerning the De herba vettonica the introductory letter Epistula ad M. Agrippam is absent. This was first printed in Zürich in 1537, edited by Gabriel Humelberg and printed by Christoph Froschauer.
c. 1481	Isidorus, De viris illustribus	Henricus Quentell	Cologne	
1481	Johannes Cassianus, De institutis coenobiorum		Venice	
1482	Petronius, Satyricon	Franciscus Puteolanus	Milan	The edition that also contains Tacitus' Agricola This edition of Petronius was made from a manuscript of Class O, which present only short excerpts of the Satyricon and almost nothing of the Cena Trimalchionis. In 1575 a new edition was published in Lyon from a different class of manuscripts which doubled he text available. Still absent was most of the Cena which was first published in Padua in 1664 following the rediscovery of the text in Trau by Marino Statileo.
1482	Panegyrici Latini	Franciscus Puteolanus	Milan	The edition that also contains Tacitus' Agricola This edition of Petronius was made from a manuscript of Class O, which present only short excerpts of the Satyricon and almost nothing of the Cena Trimalchionis. In 1575 a new edition was published in Lyon from a different class of manuscripts which doubled he text available. Still absent was most of the Cena which was first published in Padua in 1664 following the rediscovery of the text in Trau by Marino Statileo.
1482	Plinius Minor, Panegyricus Traiani	Franciscus Puteolanus	Milan	The edition that also contains Tacitus' Agricola This edition of Petronius was made from a manuscript of Class O, which present only short excerpts of the Satyricon and almost nothing of the Cena Trimalchionis. In 1575 a new edition was published in Lyon from a different class of manuscripts which doubled he text available. Still absent was most of the Cena which was first published in Padua in 1664 following the rediscovery of the text in Trau by Marino Statileo.
1482	Claudianus	Iacobus de Dusa	Vicenza	Edited by Barnabas Celsanus with a dedication to the scholar Bartolomeo Pagello. The volume includes all Claudian's works except the Carmina minora. These were first published in 1493 by in Parma by Thaddaeus Ugoletus together with the Carmina maiora.
c. 1483	Tertullianus, Apologeticus	Bernardinus Benalius	Venice	The work is undated and can only be said for certain that it was printed before 1494.
1483–1490	Frontinus, De aqaeductu urbis Romae	Eucharius Silber	Rome	Edited by Johannes Sulpitius Verulanus and Julius Pomponius Laetus.
1484	Seneca Philosophus, Tragoediae	Andreas Gallicus	Ferrara	
1484	Octavia	Andreas Gallicus	Ferrara	
1484	Boethius, In Topica Ciceronis	Oliverius Servius	Rome	
c. 1484	Consultus Fortunatianus, Ars rhetorica	Philippus Mantegatius	Milan	Edited by Franciscus Puteolanus. Others put the date considerably later at about 1493.
1485	Cicero, De optimo genere oratorum	Andreas Torresanus and Bartholomaeus de Blavis	Venice	Edited by Hieronymus Squarzaficus. The treatise was printed together with De oratore, Topica, Brutus and Partitiones oratoriae.
c. 1485	Haimo Halberstadensis, De Christianarum Rerum Memoria	Rudolph Loeffs	Leuven	Printed together with Petrarch's Rerum Memorandarum libri, to whom it was misattributed.
1486	Probus, De notis	Boninus de Boninis	Brescia	Edited by Michael Fabricius Ferrarinus.
1486	Augustinus, Retractationes	Antonius Zarotus	Milan	
1486-1487	Vitruvius, De architectura	Eucharius Silber	Rome	Edited by Johannes Sulpitius Verulanus. The book was published together with Frontinus' De aquaeductu.
1486	Julianus Pomerius, De vita contemplativa	Peter Drach	Speyer	
1487	Frontinus, Stratagemata	Eucharius Silber	Rome	Edited by Johannes Sulpitius Verulanus in the collection Scriptores rei militaris sive Scriptores veteres de re militari.
1487	Ps.-Johannes Chrysostomus, Opus imperfectum in Matthaeum	Johannes Koelhoff	Cologne	Appeared under the title Johannes Chrysostomus super Matthaeum.
1487-1488	Tiberius Donatus, Interpretationes vergilianae		Florence	The text was heavily edited by Cristoforo Landino that did not publish the full version of Tiberius Donatus' work but instead a digest inserted as part of the author's own commentary. The first complete and unadulterated edition was printed in Naples in 1535.
c. 1487	Eucherius Lugdunensis, De contemptu mundi	Jacobus de Breda	Deventer	
1488	Cicero, Aratea	Antonius de Strata	Venice	Titled Astronomica, this volume also includes Germanicus' translation of Aratus and Serenus Sammonicus Liber Medicinalis. Edited by Giorgio Valla and Victor Pisanus.
1488	Avienius, Aratea, Ora maritima and Orbis terrae	Antonius de Strata	Venice	Titled Astronomica, this volume also includes Germanicus' translation of Aratus and Serenus Sammonicus Liber Medicinalis. Edited by Giorgio Valla and Victor Pisanus.
1488	Firmicus Maternus, Mathesis	Erhard Ratdolt	Augsburg	This volume contains Johannes Angelus's Astrolabium Planum in tabulis in which extensive excerpts from book III, IV and V were first published. The complete edition of the Mathesis came out first in Venice in 1497 by the types of Laurentius Abstemius.
1488	Ambrosius, De excessu fratris	Uldericus Scinzenzeler	Milan	Also contains Ambrose's De officiis and De bono mortis, together with a few letters attributed to him. Also in the volume are Paulinus' Vita Ambrosii and two sermons written by Maximus of Turin.
1488	Boethius, De institutione arithmetica	Erhard Ratdolt	Augsburg	
1489	Boethius, De Trinitate, De hebdomadibus and De praedicatione	Paganino Paganini	Venice	Published together with Augustine's De Trinitate.
1489	Augustinus, Enarrationes in Psalmos	Johannes Amerbach	Basel	The first of Augustine's books published by Amerbach, who was to dedicate his life to printing all of the author's works.
1489	Hilarius Pictaviensis, ''De Trinitate'', Ad Constantium Imperatorem, In Constantium Imperatorem, Contra Auxentium, ''De synodis''	Leonardus Pachel	Milan	Edited by Georgius Cribellus, the volume also contains Augustine's De Trinitate.
1490	Sallustius	Eucharius Silber	Rome	First complete edition of Sallust, it was edited by Pomponius Laetus, who also added his biography of the author.
1490	Ps.-Cicero, Declamatio in Catilinam	Eucharius Silber	Rome	First complete edition of Sallust, it was edited by Pomponius Laetus, who also added his biography of the author.
c. 1490	Iulianus Toletanus, Prognosticon futuri saeculi		Milan	
1490	Ambrosius, Epistulae	Leonardus Pachel	Milan	Edited by Georgius Cribellus, it was reprinted by Johannes Amerbach in Basel in 1492 in Ambrose's complete works. An independent edition of the letters was published always in Milan two months later.
1490	Seneca Philosophus, Naturales quaestiones	Bernardinus de Cremona and Simon de Luero	Venice	The Naturales quaestiones were published in a complete edition of the works of Seneca the Younger. The volume also contained the Suasoriae and Controversiae written by Seneca the Elder, whose works were erroneously attributed to the younger Seneca.
c. 1490	Juvencus, Historia evangelica	Richardus Pafraet	Deventer	
1491	Cassiodorus, Expositio psalmorum	Johannes Amerbach	Basel	
1491	Augustinus, Contra Academicos, De libero arbitrio, De magistro, De ordine, De immortalitate animae and De animae quantitate	Angelus Ugoletus	Parma	Edited by Eusebius Conradus and Thaddaeus Ugoletus with other works by Augustine in the Opuscula plurima. It was reprinted in the same year in Venice by Pasquale Peregrino.
1491	Ps.-Augustinus, Regulae	Angelus Ugoletus	Parma	Edited by Eusebius Conradus and Thaddaeus Ugoletus with other works by Augustine in the Opuscula plurima. It was reprinted in the same year in Venice by Pasquale Peregrino.
1491	Augustinus, Expositio evangelii secundum Johannem	Johannes Amerbach	Basel	
1491–1492	Boethius	Johannes and Gregorius de Gregoriis	Venice	First edition of his complete works, but it lacks the De fide catholica. The edition was republished in 1497–1499, and followed in Basel in 1546 by a new collection prepared by Heinrich Glareanus.
1491-1492	Ps.-Hieronymus, Psalterium Romanum	Gerard Leeu	Antwerp	
1492	Marius Victorinus, De definitionibus	Johannes and Gregorius de Gregoriis	Venice	
1492	Ambrosius	Johannes Amerbach	Basel	Ambrose's Opera omnia in three volumes.
1492	Ambrosiaster, Commentarius in epistulas Paulinas	Johannes Amerbach	Basel	Ambrose's Opera omnia in three volumes.
1492-1497	Prudentius, Carmina	Richardus Pafraet	Deventer	Sine loco et anno. Probably edited by Alexander Hegius.
1493	Alcuinus, De fide sanctae ed individuae Trinitatis	Nicolaus Kessler	Basel	Present in a volume called Homeliarum doctorum.
1493	Claudianus, Carmina minora	Angelus Ugoletus	Parma	Edited by Thaddaeus Ugoletus. This was in the first authentically complete volume of Claudian.
1494	Ps.-Prosper Aquitanus, Carmen ad uxorem	Peter von Friedberg	Mainz	The poem is printed in appendix to Prosper's Liber epigrammatum.
1494	Ps.-Quintilianus, Declamationes minores	Angelus Ugoletus	Parma	Edited by Thaddaeus Ugoletus. The Parma edition lacks 9 declamations that have been printed in 1580 in Paris by Petrus Pithoeus.
1495	Ambrosius Autpertus, Sermo de Adsumptione Sanctae Mariae	Johannes Amerbach	Basel	Autpert's sermon is here misattributed to Augustine.
1496	Epigrammata Bobiensia	Johannes Tacuinus	Venice	Edited by Hieronymus Avantius in a collection of Ausonius' poems. Only 18 of the 71 epigrams contained in the Epigrammata Bobiensia were printed in this volume. Epigram 37 was first printed separately in Venice in 1498; after that, Thaddaeus Ugoletus added seven epigrams for the first time in Parma in 1499. Also, Avantius in 1509 issued a new Venetian copy of Ausonius which first included epigram 39. Due to the loss of the original manuscript it was only in 1955 in Rome that Franco Munari published the complete editio princeps when a copy of the manuscript was discovered in 1950.
c. 1496	Hucbald, Ecloga de Calvis	Peter von Friedberg	Mainz	Edited by Johannes Trithemius.
1497	Terentianus, De litteris, syllabis et metris Horatii	Uldericus Scinzenzeler	Milan	Edited by Giorgio Galbiati.
1497	Censorinus, De die natali	Benedictus Hectoris Faelli	Bologna	Edited by Philippus Beroaldus. Censorinus' work is part of a miscellaneous volume including a forgery by Leon Battista Alberti and translations of Epictetus, the Tabula Cebetis and Basil of Caesarea.
1497	Ps.-Censorinus, Liber disciplinarum	Benedictus Hectoris Faelli	Bologna	Edited by Philippus Beroaldus. Censorinus' work is part of a miscellaneous volume including a forgery by Leon Battista Alberti and translations of Epictetus, the Tabula Cebetis and Basil of Caesarea.
1497	Ambrosiaster, Quaestiones Veteris et Novi Testamenti	Johannes Trechsel	Lyon	Edited by Augustinus Ratisponensis.
1497-1498	Hieronymus, Commentarii in Prophetas minores, Liber quaestionum Hebraicarum in Genesim, Super Isaiam, Super Hieremiam, Super Ezechielem, Super Danielem, Super Matheum, Interpretatio Hebraicorum nominum and Super Ecclesiasten	Johannes and Gregorius de Gregoriis	Venice	An array of commentaries edited by Bernardinus Gadolus, all these appeared in the collection in four tomes titled Commentaria in Biblia.
1498	Fabius Planciades Fulgentius, Mythologiae and Expositio sermonum antiquorum	Uldericus Scinzenzeler	Milan	Edited by Johannes Baptista Pius with an extensive commentary to the first work.
1498	Sulpiciae Conquestio	Bernardino Vitali	Venice	Published together with such Humanist poetry collections as Gregorius Tifernus' Opuscula, Johannes Jovianus Pontanus' Neniae and Epigrams, and Octavius Cleophilus' elegies.
1498	Apicius, De re coquinaria	Guillermus le Signerre	Milan	Probably edited by Johannes Baptista Pius.
1498-1499	Cicero	Guillermus le Signerre	Milan	Cicero's opera omnia, they were edited by Alexander Minutianus in four volumes.
1499	Martianus Capella, De nuptiis Philologiae et Mercurii	Enrico di Ca' Zeno	Vicenza	Edited by Fracanzio da Montalboddo with a dedication to Giovanni Chericato, bishop of Cattaro.
1499	Ps.-Ausonius, Periochae Homeri and Septem sapientum sententiae	Angelus Ugoletus	Parma	Edited by Thaddaeus Ugoletus in his edition of Ausonius. These works were by him misattributed to the poet.
1499	Epistola Alexandri ad Aristotelem		Venice	This is the first dated edition, but it must be added that according to Lellia Ruggini the undated incunable printed by Iacobus Catalanesis is to be considered the true editio princeps.
1500	Vibius Sequester, De fluminibus, fontibus, lacubus, nemoribus, paludibus et montibus	Franciscus de Silva	Turin	Edited by Martinus Salius.
1500	Pompeius Festus, De verborum significatione	Gabriel Conagus	Milan	Edited by Johannes Baptista Pius in a volume that included also Nonius Marcellus' De compendiosa doctrina and Varro's De lingua latina.

=== 16th century ===
Date	Author, Work	Printer	Location	Comment
1501	Ps.-Cyprianus, Carmen de Pascha	Aldus Manutius	Venice	This pseudocyprianic poem was published in the miscellany Poetae christiani veteres which also included Sedulius and Juvencus. Concerning Arator, the editio princeps could also possibly be the undated impression printed in Salamanca in c. 1500.
1501	Arator, De Actibus Apostolorum	Aldus Manutius	Venice	This pseudocyprianic poem was published in the miscellany Poetae christiani veteres which also included Sedulius and Juvencus. Concerning Arator, the editio princeps could also possibly be the undated impression printed in Salamanca in c. 1500.
1502	Paschasius Radbertus, In Lamentationes Jeremiae	Jacobus Pfortzheimius	Basel	Edited by Franciscus Wyler.
1502	Braulio, Hymnus de Sancto Aemiliano	Peter Hagenbach and Gaspare Gorricio	Toledo	Edited by Alonso Ortiz as part of his Breviarium secundum regulam Beati Hysidori.
1503	Rabanus Maurus, De laudibus sanctae crucis	Thomas Anshelm	Pforzheim	Edited by Jakob Wimpfeling.
1503	Origenes, Homiliae in Genesim, Homiliae in Exodum, Homiliae in Leviticum, Homiliae in Numeros, Homiliae in Iesu Nave, Homiliae in librum Iudicum	Aldus Manutius	Venice	The 4th century translations are by Rufinus of Aquileia; the original Greek text is lost. In this edition the translations' paternity is wrongly attributed to Jerome.
1503	Asper Minor, Ars grammatica	Hieronymus Soncinus	Fano	Edited by Laurentius Abstemius.
1503	Ps.-Palaemon, Regulae	Hieronymus Soncinus	Fano	Edited by Laurentius Abstemius.
1504	Epitome de Caesaribus	Hieronymus Soncinus	Fano	Edited by Laurentius Abstemius.
1504	Ps.-Clemens Romanus, Recognitiones	Guido Mercator for Johannes Parvus	Paris	Edited by Jacobus Faber Stapulenis as part of the collection titled Paradysus Heraclidis. Epistola Clementis. Recognitiones Petri Apostoli. Complementum epistole Clementis. Epistola Anacleti. From a lost Greek original translated by Rufinus.
1504	Ps.-Probus, De ultimis syllabis	Johannes Angelus Scinzenzeler	Milan	Edited by Aulus Janus Parrhasius in a sylloge of grammatical texts.
1504	Caesius Bassus, De metris	Johannes Angelus Scinzenzeler	Milan	Edited by Aulus Janus Parrhasius in a sylloge of grammatical texts.
1504	Atilius Fortunatianus, De metris Horatianis	Johannes Angelus Scinzenzeler	Milan	Edited by Aulus Janus Parrhasius in a sylloge of grammatical texts.
1505-1506	Augustinus	Johannes Amerbach	Basel	The first edition of Augustine's Opera omnia, in eleven volumes. Due to Amerbach's efforts a number of editiones principes were printed here; among these, in 1506, De Genesi ad litteram and De dialectica.
1506	Origenes, Commentarii in Epistulam ad Romanos	Simon de Lueres	Venice	Edited by Theophilus Salodianus, the ancient translation was made by Rufinus; the original Greek is lost. Here too the work is wrongly attributed to Jerome.
1507	Ps.-Probus, Commentum in Bucolicas and Commentum in Georgicas	Bernardino Stagnino	Venice	Edited by G. B. Egnatius. The texts are present with Servius, Aelius Donatus and Cristoforo Landino's commentaries to Virgil and the works of the latter.
1507	Ptolemy, Planisphaerium	Bernardino Vitali	Rome	Edited by Marcus Beneventanus.
1508	Julius Obsequens, Liber prodigiorum	Aldus Manutius	Venice	The only surviving manuscript was found by Giovanni Giocondo during his stay in France between 1495 and 1506. After arriving in Venice in 1506 he gave a transcription of the manuscript to Manutius, who printed it together with the first complete edition of Pliny the Younger's Epistulae. The original manuscript has by now been lost, making the editio princeps the only surviving authority for the text.
1508	Zero Veronensis, Sermones	Benedetto Fontana	Venice	Edited by Albertus Castellanus and Jacobus de Lenco.
1509	Medicina Plinii	Étienne Guillery	Rome	Edited by Tommaso Pighinucci.
1509	Gargilius Martialis, De hortis	Étienne Guillery	Rome	Edited by Tommaso Pighinucci.
1509	Ps.-Probus, Catholica Probi	Enrico & Giovanni Maria di Ca' Zeno	Vicenza	Edited by Aulus Janus Parrhasius in a collection of grammatical treatises.
1510	Ps.-Hegesippus, Historiae	Jodocus Badius	Paris	The main text was edited by Jacobus Faber Stapulenis while the Anacephalaeosis was left to the care of Michael Hummelberg. Ambrose is here mistakenly considered as the translator as well of being judged the epitomator.
1510	Ps.-Ambrosius, Anacephaleosis	Jodocus Badius	Paris	The main text was edited by Jacobus Faber Stapulenis while the Anacephalaeosis was left to the care of Michael Hummelberg. Ambrose is here mistakenly considered as the translator as well of being judged the epitomator.
1510	Quintus Aurelius Symmachus, Epistulae and Relationes	Johannes Schott	Strasbourg	
1510	Altercatio Hadriani Augusti et Epicteti philosophi	Officina Marneforum	Paris	Published together with the Berosus Babylonicus: De his quae praecesserunt inundationem, a forgery by Annius of Viterbo.
1510	Hilarius Pictaviensis, ''In Matthaeum'' and ''Tractatus super psalmos''	Jodocus Badius	Paris	Edited by Robert Fortuné in the collection of Hilary's works titled Opera complura Sancti Hylarii Episcopi.
c. 1510	Victor Vitensis, Historia persecutionis Africae provinciae	Johannes Parvus	Paris	
1510	Walafridus Strabo, Hortulus	Hieronymus Vietor	Vienna	Edited by Joachim Vadianus, it was followed in Nuremberg in 1512 by Johannes Weissenburger's edition. Vietor's editio princeps also contains two of Aldhelm's Aenigmata, the first thing ever to be printed of this writer.
1511	Terentius Scaurus, De orthographia	Hieronymus Soncinus	Pesaro	Edited by Clarelius Lupus with the collaboration of Alessandro Gaboardo della Torricella. This is a sylloge of grammatical texts that puts together also works by Nonius Marcellus, Agroecius and the Ps.-Caper's De orthographia.
1511	Ps.-Caper, De verbis dubiis	Hieronymus Soncinus	Pesaro	Edited by Clarelius Lupus with the collaboration of Alessandro Gaboardo della Torricella. This is a sylloge of grammatical texts that puts together also works by Nonius Marcellus, Agroecius and the Ps.-Caper's De orthographia.
1511	Gregorius Turonensis, Vita sancti Iuliani and De Gloria Martyrum	Johannes Parvus and Jean Marchand	Paris	This volume, a Martinellus, is a collection of medieval texts on Martin of Tours which also contains texts by Sulpicius Severus and Odo of Cluny, all edited by Hieronymus Clichtoveus.
1511	Venantius Fortunatus, Vita Sancti Martini	Johannes Parvus and Jean Marchand	Paris	This volume, a Martinellus, is a collection of medieval texts on Martin of Tours which also contains texts by Sulpicius Severus and Odo of Cluny, all edited by Hieronymus Clichtoveus.
1512	Epitome Iuliani	Simon Vincent	Lyon	Edited by Nicolaus Boherius under a volume titled Leges Longobardorum seu capitulare divi ac sacratissimi Caroli Magni imperatoris et Francie regis ac novelle constitutiones domini Justiniani imperatoris cum praefaciuncula et annotationibus in ipsas II et constitutiones novellas.
1512	Gregorius Turonensis, Historia Francorum, De Gloria Confessorum and In vitas patrum	Jodocus Badius Ascensius	Paris	Contained in this impression are also a life of Gregory of Tours by Joannes Egidius and one of Paul of Thebes by Jerome.
1512	Ado Viennensis, Chronicon	Jodocus Badius Ascensius	Paris	Contained in this impression are also a life of Gregory of Tours by Joannes Egidius and one of Paul of Thebes by Jerome.
1512	Origenes	Jodocus Badius and Johannes Parvus	Paris	Edited by Jacobus Merlin in four volumes in Origen's opera omnia, the great majority of which survive only in Latin translations. Here published here for the first time were the De pricipiis and the anonymous Latin translation of the Commentary on Matthew, known as the Commentariorum series in Matthaeum. This edition also contains two apologies of Origen, one penned by Origen's friend Pamphilus and the other by Merlin.
1512	Ps.-Origenes, Commentarii in Iob	Jodocus Badius and Johannes Parvus	Paris	Edited by Jacobus Merlin in four volumes in Origen's opera omnia, the great majority of which survive only in Latin translations. Here published here for the first time were the De pricipiis and the anonymous Latin translation of the Commentary on Matthew, known as the Commentariorum series in Matthaeum. This edition also contains two apologies of Origen, one penned by Origen's friend Pamphilus and the other by Merlin.
1513	Seneca Philosophus, Apocolocyntosis divi Claudii		Rome	Edited by Caius Sylvanus Germanicus.
1513	Haito, Visio Wettini	Henricus Stephanus	Paris	Edited by Jacobus Faber Stapulensis. The volume contains several other editiones principes, that is the ancient Latin translation of the Sheperd of Hermas, Hildegard of Bingen's Scivias, Elizabeth of Schönau, Saint Mechtilde and Robert of Uzès visions.
1514	Paulus Diaconus, Historia Langobardorum	Jodocus Badius Ascensius	Paris	An independent edition of higher quality was made the following year in Augsburg by Konrad Peutinger. A third edition was made in Basel in 1532 by Sigismund Gelenius as part of his edition of Eutropius.
1515	Jordanes, Getica	Johann Miller	Augsburg	Edited by Konrad Peutinger. The volume also contains Paul the Deacon's Historia Langobardorum.
1516	Paulinus Nolanus, Carmina and Epistulae	Jodocus Badius Ascensius and Johannes Parvus	Paris	
1516	Hermeneumata Pseudodositheana	Johannes Frobenius	Basel	Edited by Beatus Rhenanus together with Theodorus Gaza' Institutio grammatica. Rhenanus made his edition from the recension known as Hermeneumata Einsidlensia, but left out the Hermeneumata's glossary while making available the Colloquia. Complete, but not from the Einsidlensia, was Henricus Stephanus' edition Glossaria duo e situ vetustatis eruta, published in 1573 in Paris. This impression contained two distinct recensions of the Hermeneumata, the Hermeneumata Leidensia and the Hermeneumata Stephani.
1516	Hieronymus	Johannes Frobenius	Basel	First edition in nine volumes of Jerome's Opera onmia, edited by Erasmus.
1516	Ps.-Jerome, In omnes Divi Pauli epistolas commentaria and Expositio Evangelii secundum Marcum	Johannes Frobenius	Basel	First edition in nine volumes of Jerome's Opera onmia, edited by Erasmus.
1517	Epitome Aegidii	Theodoricus Martinus Alostensis	Antwerp or Leuven	Sine loco. Edited by Petrus Aegidius under the title Summae sive argumenta legum diversorum Imperatorum, ex Corpore Divi Theodosii, Novellis Divi Valentiniani Aug. Martiani, Maioriani, Severi, preterea Cai et Iulii Pauli sententiis. Aegidius erroneously took here the Epitome Aegidii for the Breviarium Alaricianum.
1517	Epitome Gai	Theodoricus Martinus Alostensis	Antwerp or Leuven	Sine loco. Edited by Petrus Aegidius under the title Summae sive argumenta legum diversorum Imperatorum, ex Corpore Divi Theodosii, Novellis Divi Valentiniani Aug. Martiani, Maioriani, Severi, preterea Cai et Iulii Pauli sententiis. Aegidius erroneously took here the Epitome Aegidii for the Breviarium Alaricianum.
1517	Ps.-Paulus, Pauli sententiae	Theodoricus Martinus Alostensis	Antwerp or Leuven	Sine loco. Edited by Petrus Aegidius under the title Summae sive argumenta legum diversorum Imperatorum, ex Corpore Divi Theodosii, Novellis Divi Valentiniani Aug. Martiani, Maioriani, Severi, preterea Cai et Iulii Pauli sententiis. Aegidius erroneously took here the Epitome Aegidii for the Breviarium Alaricianum.
1519	Aquila Romanus, De figuris sententiarum et elocutionis	Nicolaus Zopinus	Venice	
1519	Rutilius Lupus, De figuris sententiarum et elocutionis libri duo	Nicolaus Zopinus	Venice	
1520	Velleius Paterculus, Historiae Romanae	Johannes Frobenius	Basel	Edited by Beatus Rhenanus, who had discovered a surviving manuscript of the work in 1515 while visiting the Murbach Abbey in Alsace in today France.
1520	Rutilius Claudius Namatianus, De reditu suo	Girolamo Benedetti	Bologna	Edited by Johannes Baptista Pius.
1520	Ps.-Cyprianus, De laude martyrii	Johannes Frobenius	Basel	Edited by Erasmus in his publication of Cyprian's works.
1520	Sententiae episcoporum	Johannes Frobenius	Basel	Edited by Erasmus in his publication of Cyprian's works.
1520	Calcidius, Timaeus, a Calcidio translatus commentarioque instructus	Jodocus Badius Ascensius	Paris	Edited by Augustinus Iustinianus
1520	Mythographus Vaticanus Tertius	Jean de Marnef	Paris	
1521	Tertullianus	Johannes Frobenius	Basel	Edited by Beatus Rhenanus basing himself on two manuscripts, the Codex Hirsaugiensis and the Codex Paterniacensis. This volume was meant to be the first complete edition of the author, but it lacks many of Tertullian's works. Those offered for the first time by Rhenanus were De poenitentia, De patientia, Ad uxorem, De pallio, Ad martyres, De exhortatione castitatis, De virginibus velandis, De cultu foeminarum, De fuga, Ad scapulam, Adversus Marcionem, Adversus Hermogenem, Adversus Valentinianos, De carne Christi, De resurrectione carnis, De praescriptione haereticorum, De Monogamia, Adversus Praxean, Adversus Iudaeos and De corona militis. Also present is the previously printed Apologeticum.
1521	Ps.-Tertullianus, Adversus omnes haereses	Johannes Frobenius	Basel	
1521	Beda, Explanatio Apocalypsis, In Epistolas VII Catholicas, Expositio Actuum Apostolorum, In Lucae evangelium expositio and In Marci evangelium expositio	Jodocus Badius Ascensius	Paris	
1521	Eginhardus, Vita Karoli Magni	Johannes Soter	Cologne	Edited by Hermann von Neuenar.
1521	Annales regni Francorum	Johannes Soter	Cologne	Edited by Hermann von Neuenar.
1521	Sulpicius Victor, Institutiones oratoriae	Johannes Frobenius	Basel	Edited by Beatus Rhenanus in a sylloge of rhetorical treatises titled Veterum aliquot de arte Rhetorica traditiones that included also Rutilius Lupus, Aquila Romanus, Emporius, Aphthonius and Augustine's De musica.
1521	Rufinianus, De figuris sententiarum et elocutionis liber	Johannes Frobenius	Basel	Edited by Beatus Rhenanus in a sylloge of rhetorical treatises titled Veterum aliquot de arte Rhetorica traditiones that included also Rutilius Lupus, Aquila Romanus, Emporius, Aphthonius and Augustine's De musica.
1521	Ps.-Rufinianus, De schematis dianoeas and De schematis lexeos	Johannes Frobenius	Basel	Edited by Beatus Rhenanus in a sylloge of rhetorical treatises titled Veterum aliquot de arte Rhetorica traditiones that included also Rutilius Lupus, Aquila Romanus, Emporius, Aphthonius and Augustine's De musica.
1521	Emporius Rhetor, De ethopoeia, Praeceptum de loco communi, Praeceptum deliberativae and Praeceptum demonstrativae materiae	Johannes Frobenius	Basel	Edited by Beatus Rhenanus in a sylloge of rhetorical treatises titled Veterum aliquot de arte Rhetorica traditiones that included also Rutilius Lupus, Aquila Romanus, Emporius, Aphthonius and Augustine's De musica.
1521	Excerpta de adtributis personae et negotio	Johannes Frobenius	Basel	Edited by Beatus Rhenanus in a sylloge of rhetorical treatises titled Veterum aliquot de arte Rhetorica traditiones that included also Rutilius Lupus, Aquila Romanus, Emporius, Aphthonius and Augustine's De musica.
1522	Arnobius Junior, Commentarii in Psalmos	Johannes Frobenius	Basel	Edited by Erasmus with a dedicatory letter to Pope Adrian VI. The editor mistakenly attributes the work to Arnobius Afer. The volume includes also Erasmus' personal commentary to Psalm 2.
1525	Gildas, De Excidio et Conquestu Britanniae		Antwerp?	Edited by Polydore Vergil and Robert Ridley with a dedication to the bishop Cuthbert Tunstall.
1525	Collectio Dionysiana-Hadriana	Joannes Schoeffer	Mainz	Edited by Joannes Cochlaeus.
1526	Irenaeus, Adversus Haereses	Johannes Frobenius	Basel	The ancient anonymous Latin translation, edited by Erasmus. Irenaeus' Greek original is lost, apart from a number of fragments.
1527	Laus Pisonis	Henricus Petri	Basel	Edited by Johannes Sichardus as an appendix to an edition of Ovid's works. Sichard claims to have personally found the manuscript of the text in the Lorsch Abbey, where the work was ascribed to Virgil.
1527	Alcuinus, Expositio In Iohannis Evangelium	Joannes Hervagius	Strasbourg	
1527	Philippus Presbyter, Commentarii in librum Iob	Adam Petri	Basel	Edited by Johannes Sichardus.
1527	Marius Victorinus, Ars grammatica	Adam Petri	Basel	Edited by Johannes Sichardus. Only the fourth chapter titled de orthographia was printed; the full text was edited by Joachim Camerarius in Tübingen in 1537.
1527	Ps.-Philo, Liber Antiquitatum Biblicarum	Adam Petri	Basel	Edited by Johannes Sichardus. This edition also contains other Latin translations of works thought to be Philo's such as Quaestiones et Solutiones in Genesim, De vita contemplativa, De Mundo and De nominibus Hebraicis.
1528	Sedulius Scottus, Collectaneum in epistolas Pauli	Henricus Petri	Basel	Edited by Johannes Sichardus.
1528	Scribonius Largus, Compositiones	Simon Du Bois for Christian Wechel	Paris	Edited by Ioannes Ruellius.
1528	Cassiodorus, Institutiones saecularium litterarum	Johannes Bebelius	Basel	Edited by Johannes Sichardus in his Disciplinarum liberalium orbis ex P. Consentio et Magno Aurelio Cassiodoro. As for Consentius' work, it was published incomplete; it was only in 1605 in Hannover that Helias Putschius made available the full text.
1528	Consentius, De nomine et verbo	Johannes Bebelius	Basel	Edited by Johannes Sichardus in his Disciplinarum liberalium orbis ex P. Consentio et Magno Aurelio Cassiodoro. As for Consentius' work, it was published incomplete; it was only in 1605 in Hannover that Helias Putschius made available the full text.
1528	Marius Victorinus, Adversus Arium, Hymni and De homoousio recipiendo	Henricus Petri	Basel	Edited by Johannes Sichardus in his volume titled Antidoton contra diversas omnium fere seculorum haereses.
1528	Ps.-Marius Victorinus, De martyrio Macchabaeorum	Henricus Petri	Basel	Edited by Johannes Sichardus in his volume titled Antidoton contra diversas omnium fere seculorum haereses.
1528	Eusebius Vercellensis, De Trinitate	Henricus Petri	Basel	Edited by Johannes Sichardus in his volume titled Antidoton contra diversas omnium fere seculorum haereses.
1528	Ps.-Athanasius, De Trinitate	Henricus Petri	Basel	Edited by Johannes Sichardus in his volume titled Antidoton contra diversas omnium fere seculorum haereses.
1528	Vincentius Lerinensis, Commonitorium	Henricus Petri	Basel	Edited by Johannes Sichardus in his volume titled Antidoton contra diversas omnium fere seculorum haereses.
1528	Salvianus Massiliensis, Ad ecclesiam	Henricus Petri	Basel	Edited by Johannes Sichardus in his volume titled Antidoton contra diversas omnium fere seculorum haereses.
1528	Rusticus Diaconus, Disputatio contra Acephalos	Henricus Petri	Basel	Edited by Johannes Sichardus in his volume titled Antidoton contra diversas omnium fere seculorum haereses.
1528	Filastrius Brixiensis, Diversarum hereseon liber	Henricus Petri	Basel	Edited by Johannes Sichardus together with Lanfranc's treatise De corpore et sanguine Domini, written against Berengar of Tours.
1528	Chromatius Aquileiensis, Tractatus XVII in Evangelium Matthaeum and Sermo de octo beatitudinis	Adam Petri	Basel	Edited by Johannes Sichardus.
1528	Faustinus Presbyter, De Trinitate	Johannes Faber Iuliacensis	Basel	
c. 1528	Vegetius, Digesta Artis Mulomedicinae	Johannes Faber Iuliacensis	Basel	
1528	Breviarium Alaricianum	Henricus Petri	Basel	Edited by Johannes Sichardus. The Breviarium here is mistakenly believed to be the Codex Theodosianus. An epitome of the Breviarium had been already printed in Antwerp in 1517 by Petrus Aegidius, called after him Epitome Aegidiana.
1528	Lucius Volusius Maecianus, Assis distributio	Henricus Petri	Basel	Edited by Johannes Sichardus. The Breviarium here is mistakenly believed to be the Codex Theodosianus. An epitome of the Breviarium had been already printed in Antwerp in 1517 by Petrus Aegidius, called after him Epitome Aegidiana.
1528	Aggenus Urbicus, Commentum de agrorum qualitate	Henricus Petri	Basel	Edited by Johannes Sichardus. The Breviarium here is mistakenly believed to be the Codex Theodosianus. An epitome of the Breviarium had been already printed in Antwerp in 1517 by Petrus Aegidius, called after him Epitome Aegidiana.
1528	Frontinus, De arte mensoria	Henricus Petri	Basel	Edited by Johannes Sichardus. The Breviarium here is mistakenly believed to be the Codex Theodosianus. An epitome of the Breviarium had been already printed in Antwerp in 1517 by Petrus Aegidius, called after him Epitome Aegidiana.
1529	Beda, De natura rerum, De temporibus and De temporum ratione	Henricus Petrus	Basel	Edited by Johannes Sichardus. Chapter 66 from De temporum ratione had already been printed separately by Johannes Tacuinus in Venice in 1505 and edited by Petrus Marenus Aleander; also the first two chapters had been printed separately in 1525, by the same printer and also in Venice, in a volume that included Probus' De notis.
1529	Caelius Aurelianus, Tardae passiones	Henricus Petrus	Basel	Edited by Johannes Sichardus.
1529	Cassiodorus, Chronica	Henricus Petri	Basel	Edited by Johannes Sichardus.
1529	Alcuinus, In Genesim	Johannes Secerius	Hagenau	
1529	Iustus Urgellensis, Explanatio in Cantica Canticorum		Hagenau	Edited by Menrad Molther.
1530	Isidorus Hispalensis, ''Quaestiones in Vetus Testamentum''	Johannes Soter	Cologne	
1530	Lex Ripuaria		Basel	Edited by Johannes Sichardus.
1530	Lex Baiuvariorum		Basel	Edited by Johannes Sichardus.
1530	Lex Alamannorum		Basel	Edited by Johannes Sichardus.
1530	Salvianus Massiliensis, De gubernatione Dei	Hieronymus Frobenius	Basel	Edited by Johannes Alexander Brassicanus.
1531	Eucherius Lugdunensis, Instructiones ad Salonium and Formulae spiritualis intelligentiae	Hieronymus Frobenius	Basel	Edited by Johannes Alexander Brassicanus. It must be added that not all sources agree in considering Brassicanus' Eucherius' editio princeps; others put before the impressions made by Claude Chevallon in 1528 circa in Paris and Andreas Cratander in 1530 in Basel. Claudius of Turin's texts were misattributed here to Eucherius of Lyon and inserted in a collection of the latter's works.
1531	Claudius Taurinensis, Expositio Libri Geneseos and Triginta quaestiones super libros Regum	Hieronymus Frobenius	Basel	Edited by Johannes Alexander Brassicanus. It must be added that not all sources agree in considering Brassicanus' Eucherius' editio princeps; others put before the impressions made by Claude Chevallon in 1528 circa in Paris and Andreas Cratander in 1530 in Basel. Claudius of Turin's texts were misattributed here to Eucherius of Lyon and inserted in a collection of the latter's works.
1531	Ratramnus, De corpora et sanguine Domini	Johannes Prael	Cologne	
1531	Jordanes, Romana	Johannes Hervagius	Basel	Edited by Beatus Rhenanus together with Getica and Latin translations of Procopius's De bellis and Agathias.
1531	Alcuinus, In Ecclesiasten	Johannes Bebelius	Basel	
1532	Theodorus Priscianus, Euporista	Hieronymus Frobenius and Nikolaus Episcopus	Basel	Edited by Sigismund Gelenius, the Euporista's text is incomplete. In the same year a complete edition was printed by Johann Schott in Strasbourg and edited by Hermann von Neuenar.
1532	Theodorus Priscianus, Physica	Johann Schott	Strasbourg	Edited by Hermann von Neuenar, this edition contains both the Euporista and the Physica. Also present in the volume was a Latin translation by Gerard of Cremona of an Arab work, Albucasis' Chirurgia.
1532	Charisius, Ars grammatica	Johannes Sultzbach	Naples	Edited by Jo. Pierius Cymnius.
1532	Rabanus Maurus, De clericorum institutione	Johannes Prael	Cologne	
1532	Salonius Genavensis, Commentarii in parabolas Salomonis et in Ecclesiasten	Johannes Secerius	Hagenau	Edited by Johannes Alexander Brassicanus.
1533	Symphosius, Aenigmata	Louis Cyaneus	Paris	Edited by Joachimus Perionius.
1533	Caelius Aurelianus, Celeres passiones	Simon de Colines	Paris	Edited by Joannes Gunterius.
1533	Cassiodorus, Variae and De anima	Henricus Siliceus	Augsburg	Edited by Mariangelus Accursius with a dedication to the Cardinal Albert of Mainz. A limited amount of excerpts from the Variae had been previously published by Johannes Cochlaeus in 1529.
1534	Ps.-Ovidius, Halieutica	Aldine Press	Venice	Edited by Georgius Logus. This book is a collection which includes all Nemesianus, Grattius, the pseudo-Ovidian Halieutica and Calpurnius Siculus.
1534	Grattius, Cynegetica	Aldine Press	Venice	Edited by Georgius Logus. This book is a collection which includes all Nemesianus, Grattius, the pseudo-Ovidian Halieutica and Calpurnius Siculus.
1534	Nemesianus, Cynegetica	Aldine Press	Venice	Edited by Georgius Logus. This book is a collection which includes all Nemesianus, Grattius, the pseudo-Ovidian Halieutica and Calpurnius Siculus.
1534	Johannes Cassianus, De incarnatione Domini contra Nestorium	Andreas Cratander	Basel	
1534	Isidorus Hispalensis, ''De ecclesiasticis officiis''	Michael Blum	Leipzig	Edited by Joannes Cochlaeus.
1534	Rabanus Maurus, Commentaria in Jeremiam	Henricus Petri	Basel	
1534	Beda, Homeliarum evangelii libri II	Johannes Gymnicus	Cologne	
1534	Petrus Chrysologus, Sermones	Agapitus Vincentinus	Bologna	Edited by Giovanni Battista Fasello.
1535	Hyginus, Fabulae	Joannes Hervagius	Basel	Edited by Jacob Micyllus together with Fulgentius' Mythologiae.
1535	Primasius, Commentarius in Apocalypsin	Eucharius Cervicornus	Cologne	
1535	Maximus Taurinensis, Sermones	Johannes Gymnicus	Cologne	This edition is incomplete since it only published 74 sermons. Among these, 39 have been judged to be spurious. New texts were published in 1684 and 1690 by the Congregation of Saint Maur, that in their editions of Augustine and Ambrose added 15 and 43 sermons attributed to Maximus. Jean Mabillon further put in 12 sermons, and finally Bruno Bruni edited 240 sermons in Rome; of these, many were spurious and quite a few modern forgeries. Eventually, A. Mutzenbecher in 1962 reduced the number of authentic sermons to 106.
1536	Marcellus Empiricus	Johannes Frobenius	Basel	Edited by Janus Cornarius, who also published Galen's nine books on medicaments in the volume.
1536	Smaragdus Abbas, Collectiones in epistolas et evangelia	Georges Ulricher	Strasbourg	
1536	Marius Victorius, Aletheia	Vincentius Portonarius	Lyon	Edited by Jean de Gagny in appendix to Alcimus Avitus' works.
1536	Ambrosius Autpertus, Expositio in Apocalypsin	Eucharius Cervicornus	Cologne	
1537	Ps.-Euclid, De Levi et Ponderoso	Johann Herwagen	Basel	
1537	Gregorius Magnus, Expositio in librum primum Regum	Bernardinus Stagninus	Venice	
1537	Beda, Epistula ad Wicthedum	Johannes Prael and Petrus Quentel	Cologne	Edited by Johannes Noviomagus. A new edition of Bede's scientific treatises after the previous one of Basel, it offers also a number of anonymous works on Paschal computation and many Carolingian glosses to Bede such as the Vetus commentarius (mostly from Abbo of Fleury) and the presumed Byrhtferth's commentaries. Novomagus also added to the volume his personal scholia to Bede.
1537	Ps.-Primasius, In Omnes divi Pauli Epistolas Commentarii	Sebastian Gryphius	Lyon	Edited by Jean de Gagny.
1538	Beda, Hexaemeron	Robert Winter	Basel	The work was here mistakenly thought to be by Junillus. This is the shorter version of the Hexaemeron; the longer version was first published in 1692-1693 in London by Henry Wharton. Wharton left out a substantial portion of the last part of the longer version; as a result it was Edmond Martène in 1717 in Paris that first edited this complete version.
1538	Sextus Placitus	Johannes Petrieus	Nuremberg	Edited by Franz Emmerich. Also in the volume is the Tractatus de Lacte, a contemporary work written by Gerolamo Accoramboni.
1538	Pacianus, Epistulae ad Sympronianum, Paraenesis ad paenitentiam and Sermo de baptismo	Charlotte Guillard	Paris	Edited by Ioannes Tillius.
1538	Apponius, In Canticum Canticorum Expositio	Johannes Faber Iuliacensis	Freiburg	Only the first six books were published in 1538. After that Angelo Mai made available in Rome in 1841 the books from the seventh to part of the eleventh; finally, Girolamo Bottino and Giuseppe Martini first put in print in Rome all twelve books of the Expositio.
1539	Ambrosius Autpertus, Sermo de cupiditate and Sermo in purificatione Sanctae Mariae		Cologne	Autpert's sermons are here misattributed to Alcuin and thus are printed in the Homiliae Alcuini.
1543	Arnobius Afer	Franciscus Priscianenses and Girolamo Ferrari	Rome	Edited by Faustus Sabaeus. Here Minucius Felix's Octavius is treated not as a separate work by Minucius Felix, but instead as the last book of Arnobius' Adversus Nationes. It will only be in the 1560 Heidelberg edition, edited by Franciscus Balduinus, that the Octavius will be correctly identified as a work of Minucius Felix.
1543	Minucius Felix, Octavius	Franciscus Priscianenses and Girolamo Ferrari	Rome	Edited by Faustus Sabaeus. Here Minucius Felix's Octavius is treated not as a separate work by Minucius Felix, but instead as the last book of Arnobius' Adversus Nationes. It will only be in the 1560 Heidelberg edition, edited by Franciscus Balduinus, that the Octavius will be correctly identified as a work of Minucius Felix.
1543	Eiricus Altissiodorensis, Vita divi Germani	Simon de Colines	Paris	Edited by Pierre Pesselier.
1543	Arnobius Junior, Expositiunculae in Evangelium		Basel	Edited by Gilbertus Cognatus. This edition in incomplete; the rest was published by Germain Morin in 1903 in Oxford in the Anecdota Maredsolana.
1543	Victorinus Poetovionensis, Commentarii in Apocalypsim Ioannis		Paris	Edited by Johannes Lonicerus as an appendix to Theophylactus' Enarrationes in Pauli epistolas et in aliquot prophetas minores. This is the heavily revised text made by Jerome of which two recensions exist, of which Lonicerus made available the shorter one. After that in Bologna in 1558 B. Millanius published the longer recension. Victorinus' original commentary came out only in Vienna in 1916 when an unrevised manuscript was edited by Johannes Haussleiter.
1544	Rabanus Maurus, In Ecclesiasticum commentarii	Simon de Colines	Paris	
1545	Tertullianus, De testimonio animae, De anima, De spectaculis, De baptismo, Scorpiace, De idolatria, De pudicitia, De ieiunio, De oratione	Charlotte Guillard	Paris	Edited by Joannes Gagneius. A new complete edition of Tertullian with many additions, known as Mesnartiana. Novatian's works were added due to their misattribution to Tertullian.
1545	Novatianus, De Trinitate and De cibis iudaicis	Charlotte Guillard	Paris	Edited by Joannes Gagneius. A new complete edition of Tertullian with many additions, known as Mesnartiana. Novatian's works were added due to their misattribution to Tertullian.
1547	Alcuinus, Enchiridion in Psalmos and In Cantica graduum expositio	Nicolas Le Riche	Paris	
1548	Marius Victorinus, Ad Candidum Arianum	Johannes Oporinus	Basel	Edited by Iacobus Ziegler in appendix to Ziegler's Conceptionum in Genesim mundi et Exodum Commentarii.
1548-1549	Lex Salica	Charlotte Guillard	Paris	Sine data, it may have been printed as late as 1557. It is also sine nomine, thus the attribution to Guillard is doubtful. Having said that, it was edited by Ioannes Tillius in a volume titled Libelli seu decreta a Clodoveo, et Childeberto et Clotario prius aedita ac postrema a Carolo lucide emendata, auctaque plurimum.
1548-1549	Lex Gundobada	Charlotte Guillard	Paris	Sine data, it may have been printed as late as 1557. It is also sine nomine, thus the attribution to Guillard is doubtful. Having said that, it was edited by Ioannes Tillius in a volume titled Libelli seu decreta a Clodoveo, et Childeberto et Clotario prius aedita ac postrema a Carolo lucide emendata, auctaque plurimum.
1549	Optatus Milevitanus, Contra Parmenianum Donatistam	Franciscus Behem	Mainz	Edited by Joannes Cochlaeus.
1549	Ps.-Ulpianus, tituli ex corpore Ulpiani	Guilelmus Morelius	Paris	Edited by Ioannes Tillius.
1550	Codex Theodosianus	Charlotte Guillard and Guillaume Desboys	Paris	Edited by Ioannes Tillius. Tillius only published books IX-XVI, while books VI-VIII were first published in 1566 in Lyon by Iacobus Cujacius. The missing Books I-V were partly salvaged by a palimpsest when Amedeo Peyron added 84 constitutions with the publication in Turin in 1824 of the Fragmenta Taurinensia. Also in 1824 Walther Friedrich Clossius published in Tübingen 79 constitutions from the Code's first two books that he had found interspersed in a copy of the Breviarium Alaricianum together with a copy of book I.
1550	Paschasius Radbertus, De Corpore et Sanguine Domini		Cologne	Edited by Nicolaus Mameranus.
1551	Rabanus Maurus, De Sacramento Eucharistiae		Cologne	
1552	Notitia Dignitatum	Hieronymus Frobenius	Basel	Edited by Sigismund Gelenius.
1552	De rebus bellicis	Hieronymus Frobenius	Basel	Edited by Sigismund Gelenius.
1552	Ps.-Abdias, Virtutes apostolorum	Johannes Oporinus	Basel	Edited by Wolfgang Lazius.
1554	Jonas Aurelianus, Libri tres de cultu imaginum	Arnold Birckmann	Cologne	
1554-1555	Corpus Agrimensorum Romanorum	Adrianus Turnebus	Paris	Edited by Pierre Galland under the title De agrorum conditionibus et constitutionibus limitum. Three of the texts of the gromatici's corpus were published previously by Johannes Sichardus in Basel in 1528 together with his edition of the Codex Theodosianus. Galland's volume while being considered the editio princeps, did not cover all texts; the Liber regionarum appeared only in 1563 when Paulus Manutius printed it in Rome. More texts appeared in 1607 in Leiden when Petrus Scriverius added other texts using the Codex Arcerianus.
1555	Beda, Hymni	Georgius Cassander	Cologne	There are 11 hymns attributed to Bede in a collection made of different authors and titled Hymni Ecclesiastici.
1556	Sulpicius Severus, Chronica	Johannes Oporinus	Basel	Edited by Matthias Flacius. It is generally but not universally considered the editio princeps, as according to another theory the first edition was printed in Milan in c. 1479 by Bonino Mombrizio.
1557	Edictum Rothari		Basel	Edited by Johannes Basilius Herold in his compilation Originum ac Germanicarum antiquitatum libri. Due to his manuscript of the Edictum being incomplete, he used the Lex Lombarda to fill the gaps present in the text.
1557	Lex Frisionum		Basel	Edited by Johannes Basilius Herold in his compilation Originum ac Germanicarum antiquitatum libri. Due to his manuscript of the Edictum being incomplete, he used the Lex Lombarda to fill the gaps present in the text.
1558	Menelaus, Sphaerica	Petrus Spira	Messina	Edited by Francesco Maurolico.
1558	Orosius, Liber Apologeticus		Leuven	Edited by Johannes Costerius.
1560	Cyprianus Gallus, Heptateucos	Guilelmus Morelius	Paris	This volume is titled In Hexamerone and presents metrical accounts of the creation by Cyprian, Dracontius, Marius Victor, Avitus and Hilary. Regarding the Heptateucos, only parts of the Genesis were printed here. In 1643 Jacques Sirmond made a few further additions to the Genesis, and Edmond Martène did the same in 1724. In Paris in 1852, Jean Baptiste François Pitra in his Spicilegium Solesmense completed the Genesis and also first added Exodus, Deuteronomy and Joshua plus parts of Leviticus and Numbers. Pitra in 1883 in his Analecta sacra et classica published in Paris and Rome published further findings, i.e. the Book of Judges and new pieces from Leviticus, Deuteronomy and Numbers.
1560	Ps.-Cyprianus, Carmen de Sodoma	Guilelmus Morelius	Paris	
1560	Dracontius, Carmina christiana	Guilelmus Morelius	Paris	
1560	Laudes Domini	Guilelmus Morelius	Paris	
1562	Ptolemy, De Analemmate	Paulus Manutius	Rome	Edited by Federico Commandino.
1562	Firmicus Maternus, De errore profanarum religionum		Strasbourg	Edited by Flacius Illyricus.
1563	Beda	Joannes Hervagius	Basel	This is the first complete edition of Bede's works, published in eight volumes. A number of texts by other authors erroneously attributed to Bede are present in the edition, such as works by Jonas and Wigbod, while some of Bede's titles are missing. This represented the first printed edition for many titles, such as De locis sanctis, Libri quatuor in principium Genesis, De orthographia, In primam partem Samuhelis, In Tobiam, In Proverbia, In Cantica Canticorum, Vita sancti Cuthberti prosaica, De tabernaculo, In Regum librum XXX quaestiones, Retractatio in Actus Apostolorum, In Ezram et Neemiam, De templo and Aliquot quaestionum liber.
1563	Jonas Bobiensis, Vita Eustasii, Vita Bertulfi, Vita Attalae and Vita Burgundofarae	Joannes Hervagius	Basel	
1563	Wigbodus, Commentarius in Optateuchum	Joannes Hervagius	Basel	
1563	Novatianus, De spectaculis	Paulus Manutius	Rome	Edited by Latinus Latinius.
1564	Ps.-Cyprianus, Adversus aleatores, Carmen ad quendam senatorem, Cena Cypriani, Adversus Judaeos	Guilelmus Morelius	Paris	The spuria are inserted in a collection of Cyprian's works.
1564	De duodecim abusivis saeculi	Guilelmus Morelius	Paris	The spuria are inserted in a collection of Cyprian's works.
c. 1564	Ps.-Tertullianus, Carmen adversus Marcionitas	Johannes Oporinus	Basel	Edited by Georgius Fabricius, Tertullian's spuria were published as genuine in this miscellany of Poetarum Veterum Ecclesiasticorum Opera Christiana.
c. 1564	Ps.-Cyprianus, De resurrectione mortuorum	Johannes Oporinus	Basel	Edited by Georgius Fabricius, Tertullian's spuria were published as genuine in this miscellany of Poetarum Veterum Ecclesiasticorum Opera Christiana.
c. 1564	Rusticius Helpidius, Tristicha and Carmen de Iesu Christi beneficiis	Johannes Oporinus	Basel	Edited by Georgius Fabricius, Tertullian's spuria were published as genuine in this miscellany of Poetarum Veterum Ecclesiasticorum Opera Christiana.
1564	Querolus	Robertus Stephanus	Paris	Edited by Petrus Daniel.
1566	Cassiodorus, Institutiones divinarum litterarum	Christophe Plantin	Antwerp	Edited by Jacobus Pamelius.
1566	Lex Romana Burgundionum	Gulielmus Rovillius	Lyon	Edited by Jacobus Cujacius together with the Codex Theodosianus.
1568	Ps.-Fredegarius		Basel	Edited by Flacius Illyricus. The volume also contains Gregory of Tours' Historia Francorum as well as the editio princeps of the Continuations to the Chronica Fredegarii. The Continuations are incomplete as they break off at chapter 24.
1568	Luciferus Calaritanus	Michael Sonnius	Paris	Edited by Ioannes Tillius.
1569	Ennodius	Henricus Petri	Basel	Edited by Johann Jakob Grynaeus as part of a corpus of church fathers it is reputed a work of low quality, titled Monumenta Patrum Orthodoxographa. Also, Ennodius was not here fully complete, an issue that was solved in 1611 when two complete editions were made by Andreas Schottus in Tournai and by Jacques Sirmond in Paris. As for Gaudentius, Tract XX had already been published in 1508 in Venice; also, in 1554 Tracts XVI and XXI were edited in Venice by Aloysius Lipomanus.
1569	Gaudentius Brixiensis, Tractatus	Henricus Petri	Basel	Edited by Johann Jakob Grynaeus as part of a corpus of church fathers it is reputed a work of low quality, titled Monumenta Patrum Orthodoxographa. Also, Ennodius was not here fully complete, an issue that was solved in 1611 when two complete editions were made by Andreas Schottus in Tournai and by Jacques Sirmond in Paris. As for Gaudentius, Tract XX had already been published in 1508 in Venice; also, in 1554 Tracts XVI and XXI were edited in Venice by Aloysius Lipomanus.
1569	Tyconius, Liber Regularum	Henricus Petri	Basel	Edited by Johann Jakob Grynaeus as part of a corpus of church fathers it is reputed a work of low quality, titled Monumenta Patrum Orthodoxographa. Also, Ennodius was not here fully complete, an issue that was solved in 1611 when two complete editions were made by Andreas Schottus in Tournai and by Jacques Sirmond in Paris. As for Gaudentius, Tract XX had already been published in 1508 in Venice; also, in 1554 Tracts XVI and XXI were edited in Venice by Aloysius Lipomanus.
1570	Phoebadius, Contra Arianos	Henricus Stephanus	Geneva	Edited by Theodorus Beza in a volume that also contains Athanasius' Orationes contra Arianos, Basil's Adversus Eunomium and the Explicatio, wrongly attributed to Athanusius and Cyril.
1572-1573	Seneca Philosophus, Epigrammata	Gulielmus Rovillius	Lyon	The volume was edited by Joseph Justus Scaliger in his volume titled Appendix Vergiliana. these first used the poetic sylloge contained in the Codex Vossianus Q. 86. Most of the epigrams were printed here among the Catalecta, where Scaliger first used the poetic sylloge contained in the Codex Vossianus Q. 86. Claude Binetus added in Poitiers in 1579 an epigram by Seneneca together with twelve new poems by Petronius; Petrus Pithoeus in 1590 also put in Seneca's epigrams from the Codex Tuaneus.
1572-1573	Petronius, Epigrammata	Gulielmus Rovillius	Lyon	The volume was edited by Joseph Justus Scaliger in his volume titled Appendix Vergiliana. these first used the poetic sylloge contained in the Codex Vossianus Q. 86. Most of the epigrams were printed here among the Catalecta, where Scaliger first used the poetic sylloge contained in the Codex Vossianus Q. 86. Claude Binetus added in Poitiers in 1579 an epigram by Seneneca together with twelve new poems by Petronius; Petrus Pithoeus in 1590 also put in Seneca's epigrams from the Codex Tuaneus.
1572-1573	Phocas Vita Vergilii	Gulielmus Rovillius	Lyon	The volume was edited by Joseph Justus Scaliger in his volume titled Appendix Vergiliana. these first used the poetic sylloge contained in the Codex Vossianus Q. 86. Most of the epigrams were printed here among the Catalecta, where Scaliger first used the poetic sylloge contained in the Codex Vossianus Q. 86. Claude Binetus added in Poitiers in 1579 an epigram by Seneneca together with twelve new poems by Petronius; Petrus Pithoeus in 1590 also put in Seneca's epigrams from the Codex Tuaneus.
1573	Collatio legum mosaicarum et romanarum	Robertus Stephanus	Paris	Edited by Petrus Pithoeus in his Fragmenta Quaedam Papiniani, Pauli, Ulpiani, Gaii, Modestini, aliorumque veterum Iuris auctorum ex integris ipsorum libris ante Iustiniani Imp. tempora collecta, et cum Moysis legibus collata.
1573	De manumissionibus	Robertus Stephanus	Paris	Edited by Petrus Pithoeus in his Fragmenta Quaedam Papiniani, Pauli, Ulpiani, Gaii, Modestini, aliorumque veterum Iuris auctorum ex integris ipsorum libris ante Iustiniani Imp. tempora collecta, et cum Moysis legibus collata.
1573	Baudonivia	Laurentius Surius	Cologne	Published in the De probatis sanctorum historiis compilation.
1574	Venantius Fortunatus, Carminum libri octo and De vita Sancti Martini	Niccolò Canelles	Cagliari	Edited by Giacomo Salvatore Solanio.
1574	Asser, Vita Ælfredi regis Angul Saxonum	John Day	London	Edited by Matthew Parker. The text had many interpolations taken from the Annals of St Neots due to Parker's persuasion that Asser was the author of the Annals.
1576	Hilarius Arelatensis, Vita Honorati		Cologne	Edited by Laurentius Surius in the first volume of his De probatis sanctorum historiis.
1577	Pervigilium Veneris		Paris	Edited by Petrus Pithoeus.
1577	Consultatio veteris cuiusdam iurisconsulti		Paris	Published by Iacobus Cujacius in his Consultationes.
1578	Eucherius Lugdunensis, De laude eremi	Aegidius Gorbinus	Paris	The volume was first to be edited by Dionysius Faucherius, but due to the former's death the editing was completed by Gilbertus Genebrardus, who also added to the impression Hilary of Arles' Vita Honorati.
1579	Cassiodorus	Sebastianus Nivellius	Paris	The first complete edition of Cassiodorus' works, it was edited by Guilielmus Fornerius and Petrus Pithoeus. The collection lacks the Historia Tripartita and the Expositio Psalmorum, already printed, as it misses also the Complexiones, as yet undiscovered; it does contain a number of Cassiodorus' works until then available only in manuscript, such as the De Ortographia. Inserted in the volume are also several works not by Cassiodorus but linked to his age and the Goths, such as Jordanes' Getica, Ennodius' Panegyricus.
1579	Edictum Theoderici	Sebastianus Nivellius	Paris	
1579	Liber iudiciorum	Sebastianus Nivellius	Paris	
1579	Isidorus Hispalensis, Historia de regibus Gothorum, Vandalorum et Suevorum	Sebastianus Nivellius	Paris	
1579	Aurelius Victor, De Caesaribus		Antwerp	Edited by Andreas Schottus. The editor had obtained in Paris view of a transcription of the Monumentum Ancyranum made by the diplomat Ogier Ghiselin de Busbecq and put it at the end of the volume as a comment to the Epitome de Caesaribus
1579	Origo gentis romanae		Antwerp	Edited by Andreas Schottus. The editor had obtained in Paris view of a transcription of the Monumentum Ancyranum made by the diplomat Ogier Ghiselin de Busbecq and put it at the end of the volume as a comment to the Epitome de Caesaribus
1579	Res Gestae Divi Augusti		Antwerp	Edited by Andreas Schottus. The editor had obtained in Paris view of a transcription of the Monumentum Ancyranum made by the diplomat Ogier Ghiselin de Busbecq and put it at the end of the volume as a comment to the Epitome de Caesaribus
1580	Salvianus Massiliensis, Epistulae	Sebastianus Nivellus	Paris	Edited by Petrus Pithoeus in the Opera omnia of Salvian's works. As for Epistula ix, it had already been published by Johannes Sichardus in his Antidoton in Basel in 1528.
1580	Calpurnius Flaccus, Declamationes		Paris	Edited by Petrus Pithoeus.
1580	Isidorus Hispalensis		Paris	First edition of Isidore's Opera omnia, edited by Marguerin de la Bigne, it included works as yet unpublished such as the De differentiis Libri II. Only the first book was printed here; the complete text of the De differentiis first came out in 1599 in Madrid when A. Gomez and J. de Grial edited again Isidore's opera omnia.
1580	Iulianus Aeclanensis, Tractatus Prophetarum Osee, Iohel et Amos	Michael Sonnius	Paris	Edited by Renatus Laurentius Barreus in a collection of works of Rufinus of Aquileia. Julian's commentary is here attributed to the latter.
1581	Corippus, In laudem Iustini Augusti minoris	Christophorus Plantinus	Antwerp	Edited by Michael Ruizius Assagrius.
1583	Gregorius Turonensis, De virtutibus sancti Martini	Maternus Cholinus	Cologne	This edition also contains Gregory's De gloria martyrum and De gloria confessorum.
1585	Ps.-Cyprianus, Carmen de Iona		Paris	Edited by François Juret.
1587	Velius Longus, De orthographia		Rome	Edited by Fulvius Ursinus.
1588	Macrobius, De verborum graeci et latini differentiis vel societatibus		Paris	Edited by Johannes Opsopoeus; three years earlier Henricus Stephanus had already printed a short piece of the text's preface in his edition of Macrobius' works.
1588	Fulgentius Ferrandus, Breviatio canonum	Claudius Chappelet	Paris	Edited by Petrus Pithoeus. This incomplete edition only presents Cresconius' Praefatio and capitulatio; it was only in 1661 in Paris that Guilelmus Voellus and Henricus Justellus published Cresconius' complete text in their Bibliotheca iuris canonici veteris.
1588	Cresconius, Concordia Canonum	Claudius Chappelet	Paris	Edited by Petrus Pithoeus. This incomplete edition only presents Cresconius' Praefatio and capitulatio; it was only in 1661 in Paris that Guilelmus Voellus and Henricus Justellus published Cresconius' complete text in their Bibliotheca iuris canonici veteris.
1588	Annales Fuldenses		Paris	Edited by Petrus Pithoeus in his Annalium et historiae Francorum ab anno 708 ad annum 990 scriptores coetanii XII.
1589	Fabius Planciades Fulgentius, Expositio continentiae Virgilianae	Officicina Sanctandriana	Heidelberg	Edited by Jerome Commelin. The text is present in an edition of Virgil's works which also contains Junius Philargyrius' commentary to Virgil, Fulvius Ursinus' notes to Servius, Velius Longus' De orthographia and also a title of Cassiodorus' also known as De orthographia.
1590	Passio Scillitanorum	Tipographia Vaticana	Rome	Several recensions of the original text survive. The editio princeps edited by Caesar Baronius in the second volume of the Annales Ecclesiastici is a recensio longior. In 1685 Jean Mabillon published in Paris for the fourth volume of the Vetera analecta what survived of another recension; to this Thierry Ruinart added a new one in 1689 in his Acta martyrum sincera. In the 19th further recensions surfaced, beginning with B. Aubé who published one in Paris in 1881 in Les chrétiens dans l'empire Romain and followed one printed in 1889 in the Analecta Bollandiana. A shorter version was found by Armitage Robinson who printed it in Cambridge in 1891.
1590	Optatianus, Carmina		Paris	Edited by Petrus Pithoeus in his anthology Epigrammata et poemata vetera.
1591	Collectio Avellana		Rome	Partly edited by Antonio Carafa in the first volume of the Epistolarum decretalium summorum pontificum. Only 166 letters contained in the collection were printed, while many others were first published in Rome by Caesar Baronius in the Annales Ecclesiastici in several volumes between 1593 and 1596. A complete edition came out only in 1895-1898 in Vienna due to the efforts of Otto Günther.
1594	Severus Minoricensis, Epistula de miraculis sancti Stephani	Tipographia Vaticana	Rome	Edited by Caesar Baronius in the fifth volume of his Annales Ecclesiastici.
1595	Arnobius Junior, Conflictus cum Serapione		Cologne	Edited by François Feuardent.
1596	Phaedrus, Fabulae	Johannes Odotius	Troyes	Edited by Petrus Pithoeus.
1597	Lucilius	Franciscus Raphelengius	Leiden	Edited by Franciscus Dousa.
1599	Alcuinus, Compendium in Canticum canticorum	Typographia Regia	Madrid	Edited by Johannes Grial as Isidore of Seville's work.
1600	Servius Danielis		Paris	Edited by Petrus Daniel as part of his edition of Virgil; some notes concerning Varro from this commentary had been published by Joseph Justus Scaliger in 1573.
1600	Victor Tunnunensis, Chronica		Ingolstadt	Edited by Henricus Canisius. Together with these two authors the volume also contains the Synodus Bavarica and Liutprand of Cremona's Relatio de Legatione Constantinopolitana.
1600	Iohannes Biclarensis		Ingolstadt	Edited by Henricus Canisius. Together with these two authors the volume also contains the Synodus Bavarica and Liutprand of Cremona's Relatio de Legatione Constantinopolitana.
1600	Ps.-Lactantius Placidus, Scholia in Statii Achilleida		Paris	Edited by Friedrich Lindenbrog in a publication of Statius' Opera omnia. It also included Domizio Calderini's commentary to the Silvae and Lactantius Placidus' commentary to the Thebaid.

=== 17th century ===
Date	Author, Work	Printer	Location	Comment
1601	Braulio, Vita Sancti Aemiliani		Madrid	Edited by Prudencio de Sandoval as part of his Primera parte de las fundaciones de los monesterios del glorioso padre San Benito.
1601	Ps.-Sisbertus, Exhortatio paenitendi, Lamentum paenitentiae and Oratio pro correptione vitae	Michael Sonnius	Paris	Edited by Jacques du Breul in the Opera omnia of Isidore of Seville due to a misattribution.
1601	Desiderius Cadurcensis, Epistulae		Ingolstadt	Edited by Henricus Canisius as part of his Lectiones antiquae.
1602	Liber Pontificalis	Joannes Albinus	Mainz	Edited by Johannes Busaeus.
1602	Hydatius, Chronicon		Ingolstadt	Edited by Henricus Canisius, it is contained in his vast and miscellaneous compilation Antiquae Lectiones. Canisius used an abridged version of the chronicle; it was only in Rome in 1615 that the full work was published, edited by L. Sanllorente. Another complete edition came out in the same year in Pamplona due to Prudencio de Sandoval.
1604	Beda, Vita sancti Cuthberti metrica	Andreas Angermarius	Ingolstadt	Edited by Henricus Canisius, these texts are contained in his vast compilation Antiquae Lectiones, seu antiqua monumenta ad historiam mediae aetatis illustrandam. The Vita Columbae first printed here is the short recension of the saint's Vita; the long recension and the complete text was first published by Johannes Colganus in Leuven in 1647 as part of his Trias Thaumaturga jointly with lives of Patrick and Brigit.
1604	Adamnanus, Vita Columbae	Andreas Angermarius	Ingolstadt	Edited by Henricus Canisius, these texts are contained in his vast compilation Antiquae Lectiones, seu antiqua monumenta ad historiam mediae aetatis illustrandam. The Vita Columbae first printed here is the short recension of the saint's Vita; the long recension and the complete text was first published by Johannes Colganus in Leuven in 1647 as part of his Trias Thaumaturga jointly with lives of Patrick and Brigit.
1604	Ruricius, Epistulae	Andreas Angermarius	Ingolstadt	Edited by Henricus Canisius, these texts are contained in his vast compilation Antiquae Lectiones, seu antiqua monumenta ad historiam mediae aetatis illustrandam. The Vita Columbae first printed here is the short recension of the saint's Vita; the long recension and the complete text was first published by Johannes Colganus in Leuven in 1647 as part of his Trias Thaumaturga jointly with lives of Patrick and Brigit.
1605	Alcuinus, De ortographia		Hanau	Edited by Helias Putschius in the collection Grammaticae Latinae auctores antiqui. Alcuin's text is here misattributed to Bede.
1605	Agobardus		Paris	Edited by Jean-Papire Masson who had discovered a 9th-century manuscript in a Lyon bookshop with many previously unknown texts. It was followed in Paris in 1666 by a better second edition carefully edited by Stephanus Baluzius.
1608	Dungalus, Responsa contra perversas Claudii Taurinensis episcopi sententias		Paris	Edited by Jean Papire Masson.
1610	Ioannes Saresberiensis, Metalogicon	Hadrian Beys	Paris	
1613	Paulus Diaconus, Gesta episcoporum Mettensium		Hanau	Edited by Marquand Freher in the collection Corpus Francicae Historiae.
1613	Favonius Eulogius, Disputatio de Somnio Scipionis	Martinus Nutius	Antwerp	Edited by Andreas Schottus in his Cicero a calumniis vindicatus.
1615	Martinus Bracarensis, Sententiae Patrum Aegyptiorum		Antwerp	Edited by Heribertus Rosweydus.
1616	Beatus Liebanensis and Eterius, Adversus Elipandum libri duo		Ingolstadt	Edited by Petrus Stevartius.
1617	Columbanus, Oratio Sancti Columbani	Nivelle	Paris	Edited by Andreas Quercetanus in a collected edition of the works of Alcuin; Columbanus' prayer was misattributed to Alcuin.
1617	Ps.-Alcuinus, Officia per ferias	Nivelle	Paris	Edited by Andreas Quercetanus in a collected edition of the works of Alcuin; Columbanus' prayer was misattributed to Alcuin.
1619	Adamanus, De Locis Sanctis		Ingolstadt	Edited by Jacobus Gretser.
1619	Eugenius Secundus Toletanus, Carmina	Sebastianus Cramoisy	Paris	Edited by Jacques Sirmond.
1620	Hosidius Geta		Leiden	Edited by Petrus Scriverius as part of his Collectanea Veterum Tragicorum aliorumque fragmenta, his edition offers only the first 134 lines of Hosidius' Medea. The editio princeps of the complete text came out in Amsterdam in 1759, edited by Petrus Burmannus Secundus as part of his Anthologia Veterum Epigrammatum et Poematum.
1625	Tertullianus, Ad nationes		Geneva	Edited by Jacques Godefroy.
1626	Erchempertus, Historia Langobardorum Beneventanorum		Naples	Edited by Antonio Cacacciolo.
1628	Expositio totius mundi et gentium		Geneva	Edited by Jacobus Gothofredus.
1630	Ps.-Tertullianus, De execrandis gentium diis		Rome	Edited by Josephus Maria Suaresius.
1630	Ps.-Marius Victorinus, Ad Iustinum Manichaeum and De verbis scripturae		Paris	Edited by Jacques Sirmond as part of his Opuscula dogmatica veterum quinque scriptorum.
1630	Leporius, Libellus emendationis		Paris	Edited by Jacques Sirmond as part of his Opuscula dogmatica veterum quinque scriptorum.
1631	Constitutiones Sirmondianae		Paris	Edited by Jacques Sirmond.
1633	Vitas patrum Emeritensium		Madrid	Edited by Bernabé Moreno de Vargas, it was followed by a more careful edition in Antwerp in 1638, made by Thomas Tamayo de Vargas.
1636	Excerpta Valesiana	Henricus Valesius	Paris	Edited by Henricus Valesius. The Excerpta are two independent texts from the same only surviving manuscript.
1638	Ampelius, Liber Memorialis		Leiden	Edited by Claudius Salmasius as an appendix to Florus' Epitome.
1641	Annales Bertiniani		Paris	Edited by François Duchesne.
1643	Praedestinatus		Paris	Edited by Jacques Sirmond.
1648	Ps.-Cyprianus, De rebaptismate		Paris	Edited by Nicolas Rigault as part of his publication of Cyprian's works.
1649	Fulgentius Ferrandus		Dijon	Edited by Pierre-François Chiffletius.
1649	Ps.-Fulgentius Ferrandus, Vita Fulgentii and Liber de Trinitate		Dijon	Edited by Pierre-François Chiffletius.
1649	Anastasius Bibliothecarius, Chronographia Tripertita		Paris	Edited by Carolus Annibalus Fabrotus.
1649	Commodianus, Instructiones		Toul	Edited by Nicolas Rigault.
1650	Ratramnus, De Praedestinatione		Paris	Edited by Gilbert Mauguin in a miscellaneous volume titled Veterum Auctorum qui IX saeculo de Praedestinatione et Gratia scripserunt Opera et Fragmenta.
1650	Johannes Scotus Eriugena, De Praedestinatione Liber		Paris	Edited by Gilbert Mauguin in a miscellaneous volume titled Veterum Auctorum qui IX saeculo de Praedestinatione et Gratia scripserunt Opera et Fragmenta.
1650	Faustinus presbyter and Marcellinus Presbyter, Libellus precum	Sebastianus et Gabrieles Cramoisy	Paris	Edited by Jacques Sirmond.
1652	Martinus Bracarensis, Opus Tripartitum and De ira		Lyon	Edited by Juan Tamayo de Salazar as part of the Anamnesis sive Commemorationis sanctorum hispanorum.
1656	Boethius, De fide catholica	Franciscus Hackius	Leiden	Edited by Renatus Vallinus. The volume includes also Boethius' Opuscula sacra and the De consolatione.
1656	Patricius		London	Edited by Sir James Ware in his Sancto Patricio adscripta Opuscula. An edition by the Bollandists followed two years later.
1663	Passio Perpetuae	Giacomo Dragondelli	Rome	A manuscript was first discovery in 1661 by Lucas Holstenius in Monte Cassino. Holtenius having died before publication, the edition was completed by Pierre Poussines, who published it together with two other works in Holtenius' collection of manuscripts.
1664	Beda, Epistula ad Plegvinam, Epistula ad Ecgbertum episcopum and Historia abbatum	John Crook	Dublin	Edited by Sir James Ware.
1665	Collatio Alexandri et Dindimi	Thomas Roycroft	London	Edited by Edoardus Bissaeus in his edition of Palladius.
1666	Ebbo, Apologeticum Ebbonis		Paris	Edited by Luc d'Achery, the text passed through at least seven reprints in historical and ecclesiastical collections. It was printed in a large collection titled Spicilegium.
1667	Columbanus		Leuven	Edited by Patricius Fleming in his Collectanea Sacra. Since Fleming had been killed in 1631, the work was published by Thomas Sirinus who added to the corpus of Columbanus' works also Ailerán's Interpretatio mystica progenitorum Christi, a penitential misattributed to Comininianus and Jonas' Vita Columbani, the latter thoroughly commented by Fleming that in the commentary also placed an old life of Comgall and excerpts of lives of eCainech, Coemgen, Fintan and Carthach. Lives of Molua and Mochoemoc.
1671	Ps.-Firmicus Maternus, Consultationes Zacchei christiani et Apollonii philosophi			Edited by Dom d'Achéry in the tenth volume of his Veterum aliquot scriptorum qui in Galliae bibliothecis maxime Benedictinorum latuerunt spicilegium.
1675	Collectio Quesnelliana		Paris	Edited by Pasquier Quesnel, who inserted as an appendix to his Sancti Leonis Magni Opera.
1675	Faustinus Presbyter, Confessio fidei		Paris	Edited by Pasquier Quesnel, who inserted as an appendix to his Sancti Leonis Magni Opera.
1677	Paschasius Radbertus, Epitaphium Arsenii		Paris	Edited by Jean Mabillon who found the only surviving manuscript, a 9th-century copy from Corbie. It is contained in the massive collection Acta sanctorum Sancti Benedicti.
1679	Lactantius, De mortibus persecutorum		Paris	The only surviving manuscript of the work was found in 1678 in the Saint-Pierre abbey in Moissac, France. The following year it was edited by Stephanus Baluzius with other texts in the Miscellaneorum Liber Secundus.
1681	Johannes Scotus Eriugena, De divisione naturae		Oxford	Edited by Thomas Gale. In appendix to the volume is Eriugena's translation of Maximus the Confessor's Ambigua.
1682	Ps.-Cyprianus, De Pascha computus		Oxford	The De pascha computus Was edited by John Wallis as part of John Fell and John Pearson's edition of Cyprian.
1682	Pontius, Vita Cypriani		Oxford	The De pascha computus Was edited by John Wallis as part of John Fell and John Pearson's edition of Cyprian.
1688	Beda, Martyrologium	John van Meurs	Antwerp	Edited by Godfrey Henschen and Daniel Papebroch, it is contained in the second volume of the Acta Sanctorum.
1688	Dhuoda		Paris	A limited number of extracts from Dhuoda's Liber Manualis were published by Stephanus Baluzius as an appendix to Pierre de Marca's Marca Hispanica. The first complete edition was printed in Paris in 1887 and edited by Édouard Bondurland.
1688	Ravennatis Anonymi Cosmographia	Placidus Porcheron	Paris	
1688	Victorinus Poetovionensis, De fabrica mundi		London	Edited by William Cave in the volume Scriptorum ecclesiasticorum historia literaria.
1690	Victor Tunnunensis, De Poenitentia		Paris	Edited by the Benedictine fathers of St. Maur among the complete works of Ambrose, but certainly not his.
1693	Beda, In Habacuc	Samuel Roycroft	London	Edited by Henry Wharton, the volume also included Aldhelm's De virginitate and Ecgbert's Dialogus ecclesiasticae institutionis together with a reprint of Bede's Historia abbatum.
1693	Hilarius Pictaviensis, Apologetica responsa		Paris	Edited by Pierre Coustant in his publication of Hilary's works for the Congregation of Saint Maur. Two short passages were discovered later by Pierre Smulders who published them in the Bijdragen. Tijdschrift voor Philosophie en Theologie in 1978.
1694	Fabius Planciades Fulgentius, De Aetatibus Mundi et Hominis		Paris	Edited by P. Jacob Hommes.
1697	Ps.-Paulinus Nolanus, Poema ultimum		Milan	Edited by Ludovico Antonio Muratori in his Anecdota together with Paulinus' poems, including three of his Natalicia.
1698	Ps.-Hegemonius, Acta Archelai		Rome	Edited by Lorenzo Alessandro Zaccagni in the first vokume of his Acta Collectanea monumentorum veterum.

=== 18th century ===
Date	Author, Work	Printer	Location	Comment
1708	Andreas Agnellus, Liber Pontificalis Ravennatis ecclesiae		Modena	Edited by Benedetto Bacchini.
1717	Polemius Silvius, Laterculus	Joannes Paulus Robyns	Antwerp	Edited by Conrad Janninck in the seventh volume of the Acta sanctorum. Janning only printed the calendar, excluding the preface, the opening chapters and the other parts; it was up to Theodor Mommsen to first print the unedited parts in 1857 in the article “Polemii Siluii Laterculus” for the journal Abhandlungen der philologisch-historische Classe der königlich Sächsischen Gesellschaft der Wissenschaften.
1717	Evagrius Gallus, Altercatio legis inter Simonem iudaeum et Theophilum christianum		Paris	Edited by Edmond Martène and Ursin Durand in the fifth volume of the Thesaurus novus anecdotorum.
1721	Cassiodorus, Complexiones in epistolas et acta Apostolorum		Florence	Edited by Scipione Maffei, who had found in 1712 a manuscript of the supposedly lost work in the Capitular Library of Verona.
1726	Ps.-Cyprianus, Ad Plebem Carthaginis and Ad Turasium		Paris	Edited by Stephanus Baluzius.
1728	Andreas Bergomas, Adbreviatio historiae Langobardorum		Leipzig	Edited by Joannes Burchardus Menckenius as part of the collection Scriptores rerum germanicarum praecipue saxonicarum.
1728	Isaac Judaeus, Fides Isatis		Venice	Published in Jacques Sirmond's Opera omnia.
1733	Ambrosius Autpertus, Homelia de Transfiguratione Domini		Paris	Edited by Edmond Martène and Ursin Durand in the miscellaneous Veterum scriptorum amplissima collectio.
1739	Victricius, De laude sanctorum		Paris	Edited by Jean Lebeuf in Recueil de divers écrits pour servir d'éclaircissements à l'histoire de France.
1740	Canon Muratorianus		Milan	Edited by Ludovico Antonio Muratori as part of his Antiquitates italicae medii aevi.
1740	Lactantius, De motibus animi		Milan	Edited by Ludovico Antonio Muratori as part of his Antiquitates italicae medii aevi.
1743	Vetus Latina		Reims	In three volumes, it was edited by Petrus Sabatier.
1751	Ps.-Cyprianus, Exhortatio de paenitentia		Bologna	Edited by Giovanni Crisostomo Trombelli as part of his Veterum Patrum Latinorum opuscola.
1755	Mallius Theodorus, De metris		Wolfenbüttel	Edited by Johann Friedrich Heusinger.
1759	Martinus Bracarensis, De correctione rusticorum		Madrid	Edited by Henricus Florez as part of his España Sagrada.
1759	Anthologia Latina		Amsterdam	Edited by Petrus Burmannus Secundus in the first volume of the Anthologia veterum Latinorum epigrammatum. Among the many poems that were printed for the first time is included Reposianus' De concubitu Martis et Veneris.
1760	Dracontius, Orestis tragoedia		Bern	Edited by J. R. Sinner. This edition only presented the verses 1-2 and 752–770; the first 53 were first published by Angelo Mai, while the complete poem was first published in Jena in 1858, edited by Karl Wilhelm Ludwig Müller.
1770	Beatus Liebanensis, Commentarius in apocalypsin		Madrid	Edited by Henricus Florez.
1773	Luxorius, Epigrammata		Amsterdam	Edited by Petrus Burmannus Secundus in the second volume of his Anthologia Veterum Latinorum Epigrammatum. 86. A few epigrams had been previously published by Claude Binetus in Paris in 1579 in his Petronii Arbitri itemque veterum Epigrammata, while some others had been made available by Petrus Pithoeus in Paris in 1590 in his Epigrammata et Poematia Vetera.
1775	Braulio, Epistularium		Madrid	Edited by Manuel Risco as part of his España Sagrada.
1777	Alcuinus, Epistulae		Regensburg	Edited by Froben Forster.
1789	Lex Romana Curiensis	Sebastianus Coletius and Franciscus Pitterius	Venice	Edited by Paulus Canciani in the Barbarorum Leges Antiquae cum notis et glossariis.
1797	Iulianus Toletanus, Ars grammatica		Rome	Edited by Francisco de Lorenzana.

=== 19th century ===
Date	Author, Work	Printer	Location	Comment
1807	Dicuilus, De mensura Orbis terrae	Firmin Didot	Paris	Edited by Charles Walkenaer.
1814	Scholia Bobiensia		Milan	Edited by Angelo Mai.
1814	Cicero, Pro Scauro		Milan	First partially edited by Angelo Mai from a Milanese palimpsest, further parts were later added in 1824 in Stuttgart by Amedeo Peyron.
1815	Fronto		Milan	Edited by Angelo Mai under the title M.Cornelii Frontonis Opera inedita cum epistulis item ineditis Antonini Pii M. Aurelii L. Veri et Appiani, nec non aliorum veterum fragmentis. Fronto's text was found in a palimpsest together with letters by Marcus Aurelius, Lucius Verus and Antoninus Pius, also published. A new augmented edition was printed by Mai in 1823. As for Arusianus' Exempla, it was mistakenly attributed to Fronto.
1815	Arusianus Messius, Exempla elocutionum		Milan	Edited by Angelo Mai under the title M.Cornelii Frontonis Opera inedita cum epistulis item ineditis Antonini Pii M. Aurelii L. Veri et Appiani, nec non aliorum veterum fragmentis. Fronto's text was found in a palimpsest together with letters by Marcus Aurelius, Lucius Verus and Antoninus Pius, also published. A new augmented edition was printed by Mai in 1823. As for Arusianus' Exempla, it was mistakenly attributed to Fronto.
1815	Symmachus, Orationes		Milan	Edited by Angelo Mai who found the text in the Bobbio palimpsest he was to use also for Fronto and Cicero. A new edition made in Rome by Angelo Mai in 1825 availed itself of a new Vatican text, thus adding some unknown material.
1817	Cicero, Pro Tullio		Milan	Edited by Angelo Mai combining a palimpsest from Milan with fragments from Turin. It only survives in fragments.
1817	Julius Valerius, Res gestae Alexandri Macedonis		Milan	Edited by Angelo Mai and titled Julii Valerii Res Gestae Alexandri Macedonis, translatae ex Aesopo Graeco.
1817	Consentius, De barbarismis et metaplasmis		Berlin	Edited by Philipp Karl Buttmann.
1817	Itinerarium Alexandri		Milan	Edited by Angelo Mai under the title Itinerarium Alexandri ad Constantium Augustum Costantini Magni filium. An excerpt had previously been published by Ludovico Antonio Muratori in Milan in 1740 as part of the collection Antiquitates Italicae Medii Aevi.
1818	Scholia Veronensia		Milan	Edited by Angelo Mai under the title Virgilii Maronis interpretes veteres, Asper, Cornutus, Haterianus, Longus, Nisus, Probus, Scaurus, Sulpicius et Anonymus.
1820	Corippus, Johannis		Milan	Edited by Pietro Mazzucchelli.
1820	Gaius, Institutiones		Berlin	Edited by Johann Friedrich Ludwig Göschen.
1820	Pompeius Grammaticus, Commentum artis Donati		Leipzig	Edited by Johann Friedrich Lindemann.
1822	Cicero, De re publica		Rome	Edition based on a palimpsest found in the Vatican Library by Angelo Mai. Of the six original books the edition contained much of the first two and a lesser amount of the following three. The Somnium Scipionis, in the last book, was preserved independently.
1822	Glossa Taurinensis		Heidelberg	Edited by Friedrich Carl von Savigny as an appendix to the third volume of his Geschichte des römischen Rechts im Mittelalter.
1823	Fragmenta Vaticana		Rome	Edited by Angelo Mai in the volume Iuris civilis anteiustiniani reliquiae.
1824	Gesta senatus Romani		Tübingen	Edited by Walther Friedrich Clossius.
1828	Marius Victorinus, Commentarii in Epistulas Pauli ad Galatas, ad Philippenses, ad Ephesios		Rome	Edited dy Angelo Mai in his Scriptorum veterum nova collectio. As for Nepotianus, the work's dedicatory letter had been previously published by Philippus Labbeus in Paris in 1657. As for Paris, he had already been used in Leipzig in 1501 by Martinus Herbipolensis to fill a lacuna that appears in all of Valerius Maximus' manuscripts.
1828	Ps.-Marius Victorinus, Liber de physicis		Rome	Edited dy Angelo Mai in his Scriptorum veterum nova collectio. As for Nepotianus, the work's dedicatory letter had been previously published by Philippus Labbeus in Paris in 1657. As for Paris, he had already been used in Leipzig in 1501 by Martinus Herbipolensis to fill a lacuna that appears in all of Valerius Maximus' manuscripts.
1828	Januarius Nepotianus, Epitoma librorum Valerii Maximi		Rome	Edited dy Angelo Mai in his Scriptorum veterum nova collectio. As for Nepotianus, the work's dedicatory letter had been previously published by Philippus Labbeus in Paris in 1657. As for Paris, he had already been used in Leipzig in 1501 by Martinus Herbipolensis to fill a lacuna that appears in all of Valerius Maximus' manuscripts.
1828	Julius Paris, Valerii Maximi decem libi dictorum et factorum memorabilium in epitomen redacti		Rome	Edited dy Angelo Mai in his Scriptorum veterum nova collectio. As for Nepotianus, the work's dedicatory letter had been previously published by Philippus Labbeus in Paris in 1657. As for Paris, he had already been used in Leipzig in 1501 by Martinus Herbipolensis to fill a lacuna that appears in all of Valerius Maximus' manuscripts.
1831	Ps.-Lactantius Placidus, Glossae		Rome	Edited by Angelo Mai and published in the third volume of his Classicorum Auctorum e Vaticanis codicibus editorum collectio.
1833	Ps.-Probus, Instituta artium		Rome	Edited by Angelo Mai and published in the fifth volume of his Classicorum Auctorum e Vaticanis codicibus editorum collectio.
1833–1838	Johannes Scotus Eriugena, Carmina		Rome	Edited by Angelo Mai as part of the miscellaneous collection Classi auctores e codicibus Vaticanis editi. A complete collection of Eriugena's poetry was edited in Paris in 1853 by Heinrich Joseph Floss for the Patrologia Latina.
1837	Anonymus Bobiensis		Wien	Edited by Joseph von Eichenfeld e Ladislus Endlicher in the Analecta grammatica maximam partem anecdota.
1837	Sacerdos, Artes grammaticae		Wien	Edited by Joseph von Eichenfeld e Ladislus Endlicher in the Analecta grammatica maximam partem anecdota.
1837	Ps.-Probus, Appendix Probi		Wien	Edited by Joseph von Eichenfeld e Ladislus Endlicher in the Analecta grammatica maximam partem anecdota.
1839	Carmen de figuris vel schematibus			Edited by Jules Quicherat in the journal Bibliothèque de l'École des Chartres. his impression was lacking of vv. 1-3, 33, 99; these missing verses were found and published in 1857 by Léopold Delisle in the same journal.
1846	Archidiaconus Romanus, Sermones		Paris	Edited by J. B. Caillau among an edition of Augustine's works.
1847	Codex Euricianus		Halle	Edited by Friedrich Bluhme as part of his Die Westgotische Antiqua oder das Gesetzbuch Reccared des ersten.
1849	Johannes Scotus Eriugena, Commentarius in Iohannem		Paris	The original manuscript was discovered by Félix Ravaisson-Mollien who edited it in the Catalogue general des manuscrits des bibliothèques publiques des départements.
1852	Aethicus Ister		Paris	Edited by Armand D'Avezac and presented as an appendix to his Mémoire on the author and his work.
1853	Johannes Scotus Eriugena, Ex positiones in Ierarchiam Coelestem		Paris	Edited by Heinrich Joseph Floss in the Patrologia Latina.
1852	Commodianus, Carmen apologeticum		Paris	Edited by J. B. Pitra in his Spicilegium Solesmense.
1853	Gregorius Turonensis, De cursu stellarum ratio		Breslau	Edited by Friedrich Gottlob Haase. Previously only unidentified excerpts were published first in Rome by Angelo Mai in 1828 and then in Leipzig by Moriz Haupt in 1838.
1854	Origo Gentis Langobardorum		Turin	Edited by Carlo Baudi di Vesme as part of his Edicta Regum Langobardorum, itself a volume of the series Monumenta Historiae Patriae.
1857	Granius Licinianus, Annales		Berlin	Edited by Georg Heinrich Pertz.
1862	Johannes Scotus Eriugena, Annotationes in Marcianum			Only parts from the fourth book were published by Barthélemy Hauréau in the journal Notices et Extraits des manuscrits de la Bibliothèque Impériale. After that Enrico Narducci in 1882 selected glosses from the seventh book while Max Manitius made available excerpts from the first three books in 1912 and 1913 in the Didaskaleion. A complete edition was finally made by Cora E. Lutz in 1939 for the Medieval Academy of America.
1863	Grillius, Commentum in Ciceronis Rhetorica	Teubner	Leipzig	Edited by Karl Felix Halm in his collection of the Rhetores latini minores, ex codicibus maximam partem primum adhibitis emendabat. Halm only published excerpts of the commentary; the full text came out in 1927 in Paderborn due to Josef Martin.
1867	Zacher Epitome		Halle	An epitome of Julius Valerius' Res gestae, it was edited by Julius Zacher under the title Julii Valerii epitome.
1867	Vinidarius, Excerpta Apici		Heidelberg	Edited by Christian Theophil Schuch together with the Apicius in the volume Apici Caeli De Re Coquinaria Libri Decem.
1867	Carmen contra paganos			Edited by Léopold Delisle in the article "Note sur le manuscrit de Prudence n. 8084 du fond latin de la Bibliothèque impériale" in the journal Bibliothèque de l'École des Chartres.
1869	Carmina Einsidlensia			Edited by Hermann Hagen in the journal Philologus.
1869	Caelius Aurelianus, Gynaecia			Edited by Franz Zacharias Ermerins.
1870	Anthimus, De observatione ciborum	F. Duemmler	Berlin	Edited by Valentin Rose. These treatises are found in a general collection titled Anecdota Graeca et Graecolatina.
1870	Caelius Aurelianus, Medicinales responsiones	F. Duemmler	Berlin	Edited by Valentin Rose. These treatises are found in a general collection titled Anecdota Graeca et Graecolatina.
1870	Philo of Byzantium, Pneumatica	F. Duemmler	Berlin	Edited by Valentin Rose. These treatises are found in a general collection titled Anecdota Graeca et Graecolatina.
1870	Braulio, Confessio vel Professio Iudaeorum civitatatis Toletanae		Madrid	Edited by Fidel Fita in the Spanish journal Ciudad de Dios.
1871	Dositheus, Ars grammatica		Halle	Edited by Heinrich Keil.
1871	Aegritudo Perdicae		Leipzig	Edited by Emil Baehrens in his Unedirte lateinische Gedichte.
1877	Audax, De Scauri et Palladii libris excerpta		Halle	Edited by Heinrich Keil for his series Grammatici Latini.
1878	Victorinus Poetovionensis, De decem virginibus		Paris	Edited by Léopold Delisle as part of his Notice sur un manuscrit mérovingien de la la bibliothèque d'Épinal.
1878	Latin Life of Adam and Eve	W. Meyer	Munich	
1879	Cassiodorus, Ordo generis Cassiodororum		Leipzig	Only survives through an epitome commonly called Anecdoton Holderi and edited by Hermann Usener.
1879	Cassius Felix	B. G. Teubner	Leipzig	Edited by Valentin Rose.
1885	Ptolemy, Optics	R. Accademia delle Scienze di Torino	Turin	Edited by Gilberto Govi.
1885	Ps.-Cyprianus, De voluntate Dei			Published by Carl Paul Caspari as an article titled "En kort Cyprian tillagt Tale om det christelige Liv. Efter cod. Einsiedl. s. VIII eller IX. Sermo sancti Cypriani episcopi de voluntate dei" in Theologisk Tidsskrift.
1886	Metz Epitome			Edited by Dietrich Volkmann.
1886	Fragmenta Gaudenziana		Bologna	Edited by Augusto Gaudenzi in his Un'antica compilazione di diritto romano e visigoto con alcuni framenti delle leggi di Eurico tratta da un manoscritto della biblioteca di Holkham.
1887	Hilarius Pictaviensis, De mysteriis and Hymni		Rome	Edited by Gian Francesco Gamurrini.
1887	Egeria, Peregrinatio Aetheriae		Rome	Edited by Gian Francesco Gamurrini.
1891	Actus Petri cum Simone		Leipzig	Edited by Richard Adelbert Lipsius in the collection Acta Apostolorum Apocrypha. An ancient partial Latin translation of the lost Acts of Peter.
1893	Apocalypse of Paul	M. R. James	Cambridge	
1897	Ps.-Fulgentius, Super Thebaiden			Published by Rudolf Helm in the article "Anecdoton Fulgentianum" in the journal Rheinisches Museum für Philologie.
1897	Iulianus Aeclanensis, Expositio libri Iob			Edited by Ambrogio Amelli in the third volume of the Spicilegium Cassinense. Here Amelli erroneously gave the paternity of the work to Philip the Presbyter.
1897	Prophetiae		Monte Cassino	Edited by Ambrogio Amelli in his Miscellanea Cassinense.
1899	Paulus Diaconus, Ars Donati		Montecassino	Edited by Ambrogio Amelli under the title Ars Donati quam Paulus Diaconus exposuit.
1899	Fragmenta Augustodunensia			Edited by Émile Chatelain in the Revue de Philologie.
1900	Liber de Morte Alexandri Magni		Strasbourg	Edited by O. Wagner together with the Metz Epitome.
1900	Hippolytus, Traditio apostolica	Teubner	Leipzig	Edited by Edmund Hauler from the Verona Palimpsest in the Didascaliae apostolorum fragmenta Veronensia latina. Accedunt canonum qui dicuntur Apostolorum et Aegyptiorum reliquiae. Probably a Latin translation of the Greek original.
1900	Apringius, Tractatus in Apocalypsim	Alphonse Picard	Paris	Edited by Marius Férotin.

=== 20th century ===
Date	Author, Work	Printer	Location	Comment
1907	Dicuilus, Liber de astronomia		Dublin	Edited by Mario Esposito in the Proceedings of the Royal Irish Academy.
1913	Arnobius Junior, Liber ad Gregoriam	Picard	Paris	Edited by Germain Morin in the first volume of the Anecdota Maredsolana.
1914	Ps.-Cyprianus, De centesima, sexagesima, tricesima			Edited by Richard Reitzenstein in the article "Eine früchristliche Schrift von den dreierlei Früchten des christlichens Lebens" published in the journal Zeitschrift für die Neutestamentliche Wissenschaft.
1920	Fortunatianus Aquileiensis, Commentarii in Evangelia			Two excerpts edited by André Wilmart in "Deux expositions d'un évêque Fortunat sur l'évangile" in Revue Bénédictine; a further excerpt was published by Bernhard Bischoff in 1954. But the proper editio princeps came out only in 2017 when a complete manuscript was found and published in Berlin by Lukas J. Dorfbauer for the Corpus Scriptorum Ecclesiasticorum Latinorum.
1925	Epistle of Pseudo-Titus	D. de Bruyne		
1926	Pelagius, Expositiones XIII epistularum Pauli	Cambridge University Press	Cambridge	Edited by Alexander Souter.
1937	Ps.-Marius Victorinus, De soloecismo et barbarismo		Neuchâtel	Edited by M. Niedermann together with Consentius' Ars de barbarismis et metaplasmis.
1939	Vincentius Lerinensis, Excerpta		Madrid	Edited by José Madoz in the Estudios Orienses. Ambrogio Amelli had edited the first part in 1888 in the Spicilegium Cassinense, but he had not identified the author.
1944	Cyprianus, Epistula ad Silvanum et Dontianum			Edited by Maurice Bevénot in the article "A New Cyprianic Fragment" in the journal Bulletin of the John Rylands Library.
1951	Mundus origo			Edited by Bernhard Bischoff in the article "Die lateinischen Übersetzungen und Bearbeitungen aus den Oracula Sibyllina" in Mélanges Joseph de Ghellinck, S.J..
1962-1965	Remigius Autissiodorensis, Commentum in Martianum Capellam	Brill	Leiden	Edited by Cora E. Lutz in two volumes.
1974	Anonymus Budapest	Herder	Freiburg	Edited by Hermann Josef Frede under the title Ein neuer Paulustext und Kommentar.
1984	Epistola Anne ad Senecam		Stuttgart	Edited by Bernhard Bischoff as an entry titled “Der Brief des Hohenpriesters Annas an den Philosophen Seneca – eine jüdisch-apolotegetische Missionsschrift (Viertes Jahrhundert?)” in his collection of recent findings Anecdota novissima: Texte des vierten bis sechzehnten Jahrhunderts.

== Latin Translations ==
Date	Author, Work	Printer	Location	Comment
c. 1466	John Chrysostom, Nonaginta homiliae in Mattheum	Johannes Mentelin	Strasbourg	Latin translation by Georgius Trapezuntius. The translation was made between 1448 and 1450.
1469	Alcinous	Conradus Sweynheym and Arnoldus Pannartz	Rome	Translated sometime before 1461 by Petrus Balbus with a dedication to Nicholas of Cusa. This author is contained in the editio princeps of Apuleius' works edited by Joannes Andreas.
1470	Eusebius, Praeparatio Evangelica	Nicolaus Jenson	Venice	Translated by Georgius Trapezuntius between 1448 and 1450. The edition omits the last of the 15 books due to the use of an incomplete manuscript. Beginning with that of Andreas Contrarius in 1454, this translation was object of many criticisms.
1471	Corpus Hermeticum	Gerardus de Lisa	Treviso	Translation finished by Marsilio Ficino in 1463 following a request by Cosimo de' Medici. The volume, entitled Pimander, sive De potestate et sapientia Dei, only includes the translation of 14 of the 18 texts that compose the Corpus Hermeticum.
1471	Letter of Aristeas	Matthias Palmerius	Rome	
1472	Diodorus Siculus	Baldassarre Azzoguidi	Bologna	Partial Latin translation by Poggio Bracciolini; complete Greek edition 1559.
1474	Homer, Iliad	Henricus de Colonia and Statius Gallicus	Brescia	Translated by Lorenzo Valla. A partial Latin translation by Nicolaus de Valle was published earlier in the same year.
1475	Aristoteles, Rhetorica	Iohannes Stoll and Petrus Caesaris Wagner	Paris	Latin translation by Georgius Trapezuntius. The translation had been accomplished between 1443 and 1446.
1481	Themistius, De anima		Treviso	Translated and edited by Hermolaus Barbarus, with a dedication to the humanist Georgius Merula.
1482	Euclides	Erhard Ratdolt		Latin edition.
1484	Plato	Laurentius de Alopa	Florence	Opera Omnia Latin edition. Translated by Marsilio Ficino.
1498	Aristoteles, Ars Poetica			Translated by Giorgio Valla
1527	Philo	Adam Petri	Basel	Edited by Johannes Sichardus. First part published by Agostino Giustiniani (Iustianus), O.P. in Paris (1520)
1552	Gospel of James	Guillame Postel	Basel	
1558	Marcus Aurelius, Meditations	Andreas Gessner	Zürich	Edited and translated into Latin by Wilhelm Xylander (title: De seipso, seu vita sua, libri 12)
1562	Sextus Empiricus	Henri Estienne	Geneva	Latin translation of Sextus's "Outlines", followed by a complete Latin Sextus with Gentian Hervet as translator in 1569. Petrus and Jacobus Chouet published the Greek text for the first time in 1621.
1575	Diophantus	Eusebius Episcopius & heirs of Nicolaus Episcopius	Basel	Edition of Rerum Arithmeticarum Libri sex translated by Xylander
1659	Ps.-Archimedes, Lemmata	William Leybourn	London	Edited by John Greaves.
1706	Apollonius of Perga, De Rationis Sectione	E Theatro Sheldoniano	Oxford	Translated by Edmond Halley.
1861	Assumption of Moses	Antonio Ceriani	Milan	
1861	Book of Jubilees	Antonio Ceriani	Milan	
