= Sixtus Riessinger =

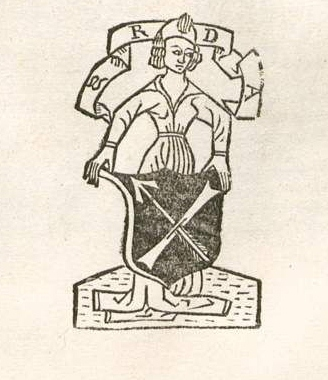
Sixtus Riessinger, German typographer and Catholic priest

Sixtus Riessinger (1440/45-post 1505), also called Xistus Reissinger or Rüssinger, was a German printer active in Italy.

Reissinger was born between 1440 and 1445 in Sulz am Neckar in the Holy Roman Empire. A priest's son, he followed his father's path by becoming himself a clergyman. It is believed that he attended the University of Freiburg and completed his studies in the 1464–1465 semester. Before leaving for Rome, he is thought to have worked in Strasbourg in Heinrich Eggestein's printing shop.

It seems he was already in Rome by 1465 and had already established connections with the Roman Curia. From 1467 to 1470, Riessinger became a prominent printer in Rome, publishing at least ten books, among them the possible editio princeps of Jerome's letters and tractates. The issue is controversial, since others have often put first Arnold Pannartz and Konrad Sweynheim's edition.
