= Sulpicius Victor =

Latin rhetor

Sulpicius Victor was a Latin rhetor who lived in the 4th century AD. He wrote Institutiones oratoriae, dedicated to his son-in-law. The only manuscript of this work has been lost and the editio princeps, which is the only reliable source, was printed in 1521. A new critical edition was issued in 2018, replacing Halm's one.

== Bibliography ==
- Rainer Jakoby, Institutiones oratoriae, De Gruyter, 2018.
