= Johannes Schüssler =

Johannes Schüssler was a fifteenth-century German bookprinter from Augsburg.

The first edition of any of the works of Josephus consists of the fourth-century Latin translation of The Jewish War ascribed to Rufinus, and the sixth-century translation of the Jewish Antiquities made at the behest of Cassiodorus. Printed only 14 years after Gutenberg's Bible, it is the first dated book of the printer J. Schüssler in Augsburg. Schüssler also printed Paulus Orosius's Historiae adversus paganos in Augsburg in 1471.

== Trivia ==
He is a possible relative of later goldsmiths in Besztercebánya, Kingdom of Hungary. There was an increased influx of German craftsmen from Augsburg to Besztercebánya through Fugger and Thurzó and their company Ungarischer Handel.
