= Carmen de figuris vel schematibus =

Carmen de figuris vel schematibus is a rhetoric work written in the 4th-5th century AD. It is a poem composed of 186 lines, discussing almost 60 figures of speeches. Its author is anonymous, but he surely was inspired by Alexander Numenius' and Publius Rutilius Lupus' treatises.
