= Robert of Uzès =

Robert of Uzès or Robert d'Uzès was a medieval Dominican friar and author. A contemporary of Dante and Eckhart, in 1292 he wrote a Livre des Paroles, in which a dream is used as a political prophecy and to satirize the rich and powerful, particularly Pope Boniface VIII. It predicts great calamities and comes from the same milieu and perspective as Joachim of Fiore and the "spirituels".

== Sources ==
- Amargier, P (1980). "Un réformateur avignonnais du XIII siècle, le dominicain Robert d'Uzès (1263-1296)" [An 18th century reformer from Avignon, the Dominican Robert d'Uzès (1263-1296)]. Annales Universitaires. Faculté des Lettres et Sciences Humaines, Avignon Avignon (in French): 1–6. INIST 12501659.
