= Emporius =

Emporius was a Roman Latin rhetorician and the author of three short tracts titled De Ethopoeia ac Loco Communi Liber, Demonstrativae Maleteriae praeceptum and De Deliberatia Specie. He is believed to have flourished not earlier than the sixth century, chiefly from the circumstance that he refers in his illustrations to the regal power rather than to the imperial dignity, which he would scarcely have done had he lived before the revival of the kingly title.

Emporius was first edited by Beatus Rhenanus, along with some other authors upon rhetoric. The pieces named above will all be found in the Antiqui Rhetores Latini of Francois Pithou.
