= Consultus Fortunatianus =

Latin Christian rhetor

Consultus Fortunatianus, also known as C. Chirius Fortunatianus, was a Latin Christian rhetor who lived in the 4th–5th century AD, perhaps of African ancestry. He wrote an Ars rhetorica, in three books. This work was published before 435, since it was used by Martianus Capella. One of the manuscripts (Cod. Bodmer 146, 10th century) was owned by Petrarch, who studied and commented on it with many glossa.
