= Jean de Gagny =

French theologian

Jean de Gagny (died 1549) was a French theologian.

He was at the Collège de Navarre in 1524. He became Rector of the University of Paris, in 1531, and Almoner Royal, in 1536. In 1546 he became Chancellor of the University of Paris.

He published some significant Roman Catholic commentaries on parts of the New Testament. He was also a business partner of the typographer Claude Garamond, and collector of manuscripts, particularly of patristic works. His position close to Francis I of France gave him access to monastic libraries.
