= Christophorus Valdarfer =

Christophorus Valdarfer was an early printer, active in Venice and Milan in the second half of the fifteenth century.
