= Giovanni and Gregorio De Gregori =

Giovanni (fl. 1482–1503) and Gregorio (fl. 1496–1527) De Gregori (Latin: Johannes & Gregorius de Gregoriis) were two Italian brothers from Forlì who worked as printers in Renaissance Venice. They are generally credited with the first attractive type in nonpareil size for a 1498 or 1501 edition of the divine offices.

Gregorio de Gregori is considered to have published the first book printed in Arabic, Kitab salat al-sawai—a book of hours—in 1514.
