= Leopoldo Marco Antonio Caldani =

Italian anatomist and physiologist (1725–1813)

Leopoldo Marco Antonio Caldani FRS
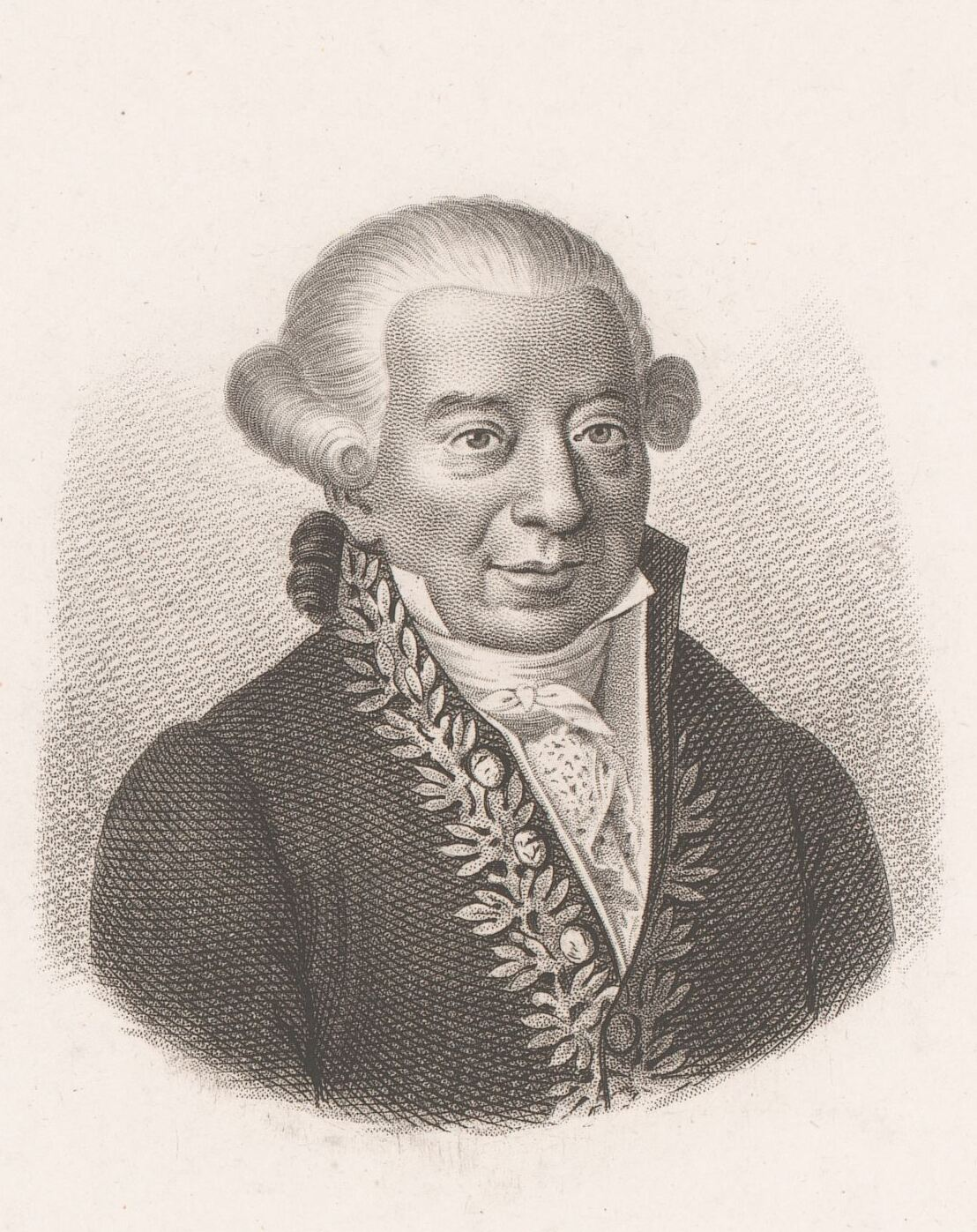
- Leopoldo Marco Antonio Caldani
- Born: 21 November 1725; Bologna, Papal States (now Italy)
- Died: 30 December 1813 (aged 88); Padua, Kingdom of Italy
- Education: University of Bologna
- Occupations: Physiologist; Academic
- Scientific career
- Fields: Anatomy; Physiology
- Workplaces: University of Padua
- Notable students: Antonio Scarpa

Leopoldo Marco Antonio Caldani FRS (21 November 1725 – 30 December 1813) was an Italian anatomist and physiologist noted for his experimental studies on the function of the spinal cord and for his pioneering work in electrical brain stimulation. He described the coracoclavicular ligament in 1802 which bears his name.

== Life ==
=== Early life and education ===
Caldani was born in Bologna, Italy, on 21 November 1725, to an ancient noble family. His younger brother, Petronio Maria Caldani (1735–1808), was professor of mathematics at Bologna, and was described by D'Alembert as the "first geometer and algebraist of Italy." Caldani studied medicine at the University of Bologna, receiving his degree in 1750, and became a professor of practical medicine in 1755.

=== Career ===
Caldani was especially concerned with comparative anatomy and physiology, acquiring valuable knowledge through animal experimentation. In 1756 he began a correspondence with the Swiss anatomist Albrecht von Haller that was to be carried on for a period of 20 years. Caldani was intrigued by Haller's theory of irritability, which at the time was a controversial topic, and conducted several experiments in collaboration with Felice Fontana to verify and amplify Haller's findings.

In his experimental demonstrations on irritability Caldani employed electricity as a tool to induce contractions in animal preparations, thus laying the ground work for the future experiments of Luigi Galvani on animal electricity. Eventually his work helped to make Haller's theories acceptable in Italian physiological circles. This cemented the professional bond between the two men.

In 1761 Caldani left Bologna to become professor of theoretical medicine at Padua, and in 1772 he succeeded Giovanni Battista Morgagni as professor of anatomy, a position he held for the next thirty years. His textbooks on anatomy, physiology and pathology underwent numerous editions and translations, and were widespread across Europe until the first decades of the 19th century. Caldani created the anatomical museum of the University of Padua. In his later years he was aided in his anatomic and literary works by his nephew, the anatomist Floriano Caldani. He retired in 1805 and died in Padua on 30 December 1813, aged 88.

Caldani was a member of many scientific academies. In 1760 he became an associate of the Prussian Academy of Sciences and of the Göttingen Academy of Sciences and Humanities, and in 1772 he was elected a Fellow of the Royal Society of London. In 1786 he was appointed as a member of the Accademia nazionale delle scienze.

=== Legacy ===
Caldani was noted for experimental studies on the function of the spinal cord and for the introduction of electricity in the physiology of the nerves. He was among the first physiologists to practice electrical stimulation directly on animal brains. Especially valuable too was his attempt more exactly to determine the influence of electrical stimulation on cardiac activity. His most celebrated work is his anatomical atlas Icones anatomicae (Anatomical Images), published in Venice in 1801–1814. Its two volumes of illustrations, accompanied by five of annotation, are considered among the finest of their kind.

== Works ==
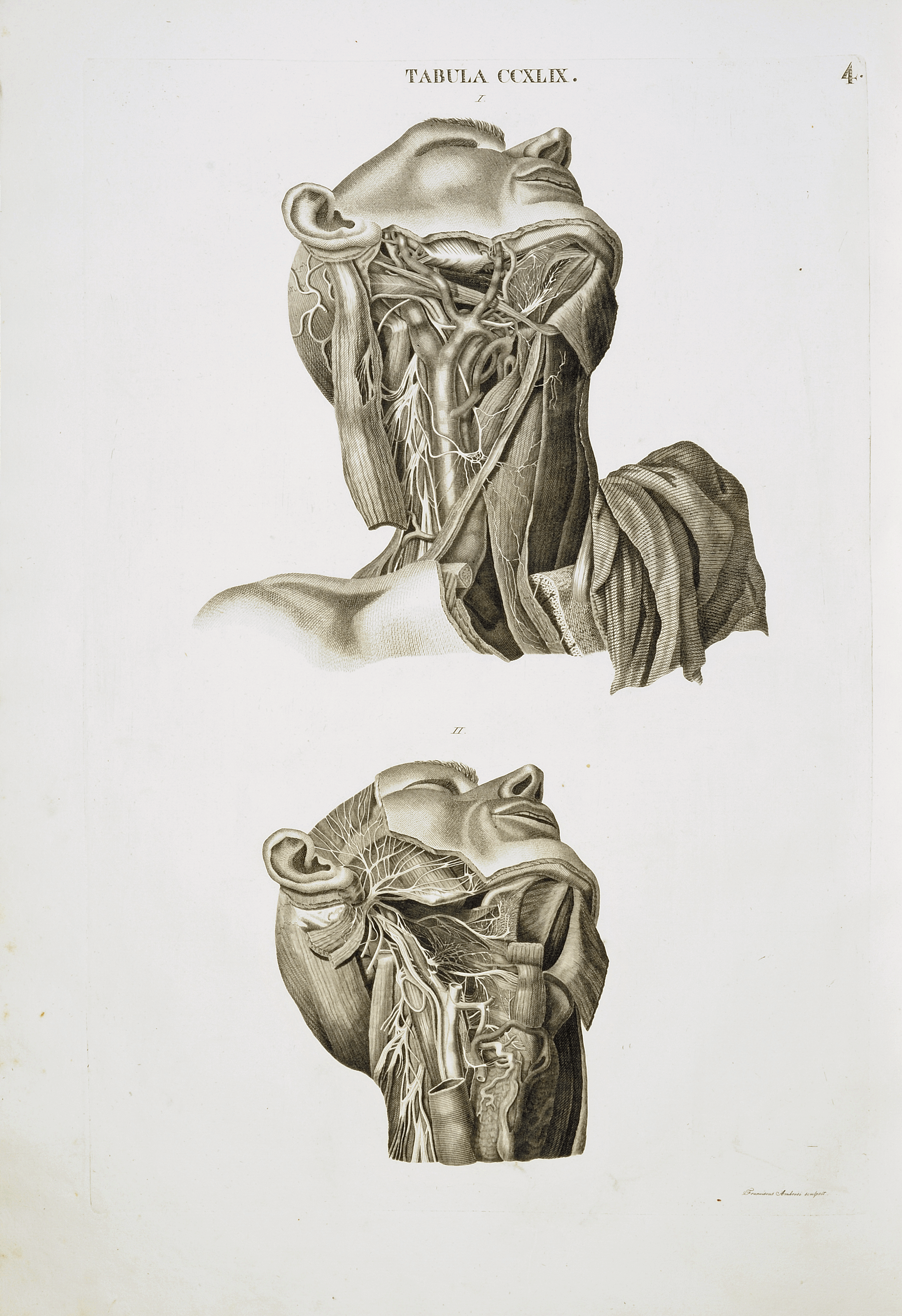
Anatomical plate of human head and neck from Caldani's Icones anatomicae

- Sull'intensività et irritabilità di alune parti degli animali (Bologna, 1757), trans, as "Lettre de Mr. Marc Antoine Caldani à Mr. Albert de Haller sur l’insensibilité et l’irritabilité de quelques parties des animaux" in A. Haller. Mémoires sur les parties sensible et irritables du corps animal. III (Lausanne. 1760). 1–156.
- Lettera sopra l'irritabilità et insensività Halleriana (Bologne, 1759)
- Lettera sull'uso del muschio nella idrofobia (Venice, 1767)
- Esame del capitolo settimo dell'ultima opera di Antonio de Haen (Padua, 1770)
- Innesto felice del vajuolo (Padua, 1768)
- Institutiones pathologicae (Padua, 1772, 1776; Leyden, 1784; Venice, 1786; Naples, 1787), translated into German by Reuss (1784), and issued at Prague (1793), in connection with Institutiones physiologicae
- Dialoghi di fisiologia e di patologia (Padua, 1778, 1793)
- Institutiones physiologicae (Padua, 1773, 1778; Leyden, 1784; Venice, 1786; Naples, 1787)
- Institutiones semeioticae (Padua, 1808)
- Icones anatomicae with 5 vols. of Explicatio iconum (Venice, 1801–13)

== Bibliography ==
- Choulant, Johann Ludwig (1852). History and Bibliography of Anatomic Illustration in Its Relation to Anatomic Science and the Graphic Arts. Translated by Mortimer Frank. Chicago: University of Chicago Press. pp. 327–329.
- This article incorporates text from a publication now in the public domain: Senfelder, Leopold (1913). "Leopoldo Marco Antonio Caldani". In Herbermann, Charles (ed.). Catholic Encyclopedia. Vol. 16. New York: Robert Appleton Company.
- Castiglioni, Arturo (1941). A History of Medicine. New York: Alfred A. Knopf. p. 600.
- Baldini, Ugo (1973). "CALDANI, Leopoldo Marcantonio". Dizionario Biografico degli Italiani (in Italian). Vol. 16: Caccianiga–Caluso. Rome: Istituto dell'Enciclopedia Italiana. pp. 553–555. ISBN 978-88-12-00032-6.
- Piccolino, Marco (1998). "Animal electricity and the birth of electrophysiology: The legacy of Luigi Galvani" (PDF). Brain Research Bulletin. 46 (5): 381–407. doi:10.1016/s0361-9230(98)00026-4. PMID 9739001.
- Ongaro, Giuseppe (2001). "Leopoldo Marc'Antonio Caldani e la riforma dell'Accademia di Padova (1779)". In E. Riondato (ed.). Dall'Accademia dei Ricovrati all'Accademia Galileiana. Padua: Accademia Galileiana di Scienze, Lettere ed Arti. pp. 393–410.
- Porzionato, Andrea; Macchi, Veronica; Stecco, Carla; Parenti, Anna; De Caro, Raffaele (2012). "The Anatomical School of Padua". The Anatomical Record. 295 (6): 902–916. doi:10.1002/ar.22460. PMID 22581496.
