= Johannes Schott =

Book printer

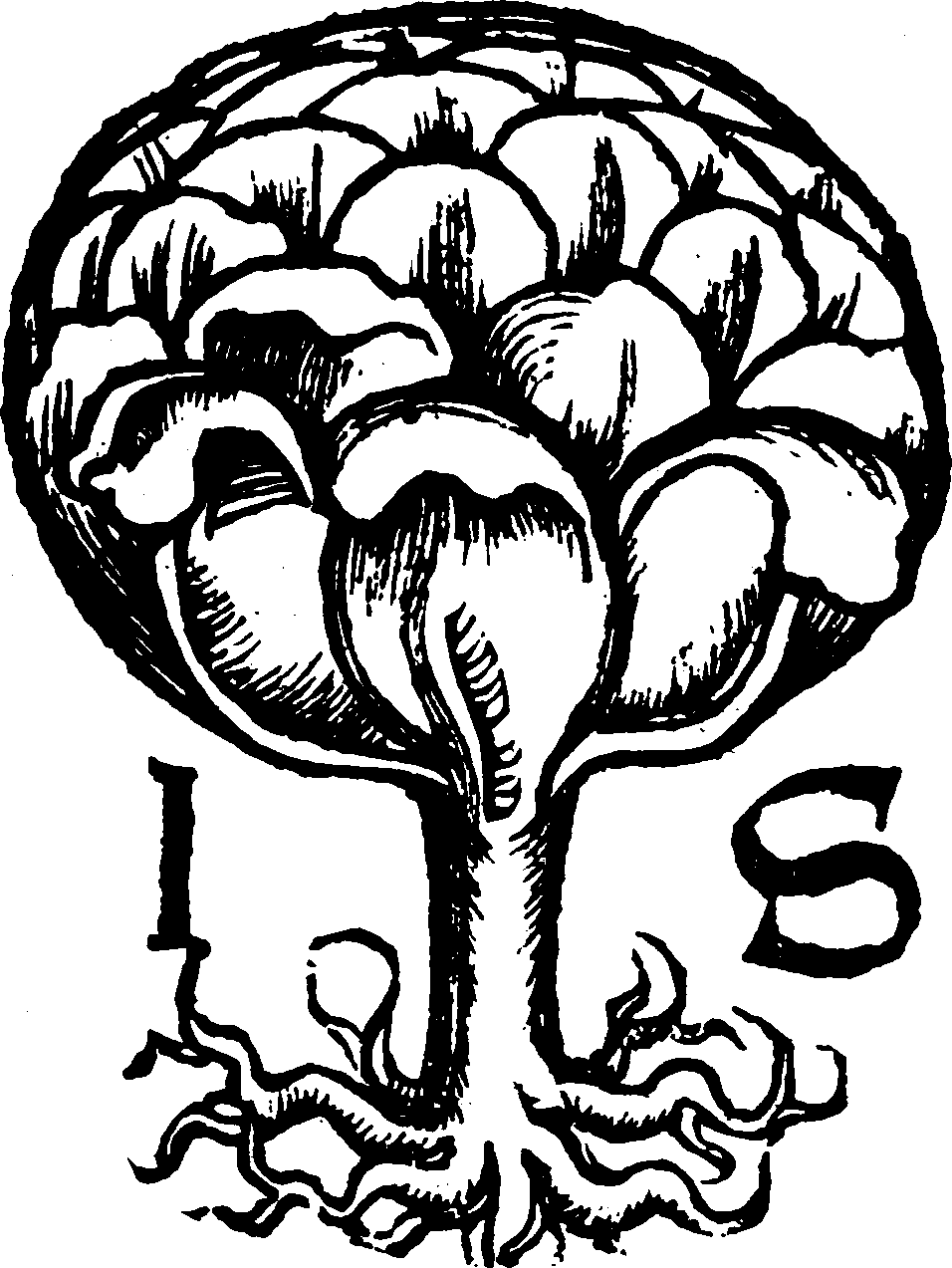
Johannes Schott's printer's mark, 1502

Johannes Schott (19 June 1477 – c. 1550) was a book printer from Strasbourg. He printed a large number of books, including tracts from Martin Luther and other Reformers. He was a well-educated man, who had relationships with some of the leading humanists of his time. His press also was one of the first to be able to print chiaroscuro woodcuts.

== Biography ==
Schott's father, Martin Schott, established a printing business in Strasbourg around 1480; his mother was one of the children of printer Johannes Mentelin. Johannes attended university in Freiburg (in 1490, at age 13), in Heidelberg (1492), and in Basel (1497). This German humanist education affected his later printing career; he likely edited the Enchiridion poëticum that his press printed in 1514. Prefaces to his books indicate his scholarly education, and he seems to have had personal relationships on equal footing with the scholars of his time.

The first known book printed by him dates from 1500 (his father died in 1499); he was active as a printer for half a century. A lull in his activity occurred between 1503 and 1508, when he produced only three books, all versions of the Margarita Philosophica, an encyclopedia by German humanist Gregor Reisch. The locations of those three books may indicate that the Schott press was moving around, with stops in Freiburg and Basel. Kusukawa proposes that the first printing may have happened in Freiburg "to allow Schott to work closely with the author".

Some 130 titles from his press are known, but the real number probably exceeds 150. They include many humanistic works (from Italian scholars and Germans, particularly Ulrich von Hutten), and also classical literature. When Martin Luther began his efforts to reform the Catholic church, Schott put his press to the service of the Reformation, maintaining a personal relationship with Luther besides a professional one. Schott printed Luther's so-called Invocavit Sermons, based on notes sent to him by people in Wittenberg. Schott also printed Ulrich von Hutten's Ulrichi ab Hutten cum Erasmo Rotirodamo, Presbytero, Theologo, Expostulatio (part of von Hutten's polemic with Desiderius Erasmus), which contained a woodcut of von Hutten and Erasmus; it was thought (in 1850) to be the earliest known woodcut of the latter. He also published books on medicine, many of which were reprinted, even abroad. Like his father, he valued the esthetics of his books; a number of them are embellished richly with woodprints, some of which by Hans Baldung and Hans Wechtlin. Schott's formschneider or block-cutter was (according to the Allgemeine Deutsche Biographie) the first to create chiaroscuro woodcuts with three blocks.

== Copyright case ==
In 1533, Schott sued the Frankfurt printer Christian Egenolff, who had published the Kreuterbuch by Eucharius Rösslin. Schott maintained that Egenolff had violated the copyright laws (an imperial privilege for six years after publication) by copying from his Herbarium Vivae Icones, illustrated by Hans Weiditz and compiled and annotated by Otto Brunfels. Egenolff countered that his book was in fact copied from a much older book, by Johannes von Cube, and this was not forbidden. Furthermore, fifty of the images in his book were not in Schott's, and vice versa. Third, images based on nature are likely to resemble each other because the objects represented will be the same. Finally, there is no exclusive right on a subject, say Adam and Eve, that forbids an artist to depict it if someone else had already done so. It is not known how the lawsuit was decided.

== Notable books ==
- Gregor Reisch, Margarita Philosophica (three printings, 1503–1508)
- Das Leben Jesu Christi (1508)
- Hans von Gersdorff, Feldbuch der Wundarzney (with woodcuts by Hans Wechtlin, 1517)
- Martin Waldseemüller, Matthias Ringmann, Jacobus Eszler, and Georgius Ubelin, Ptolemy's Geographia (1513)
- Johannes Indagine, Introductiones apotelematiscae (1522)
- Johannes Indagine, Die Kunst der chiromanzey (German translation of Introductiones apotelematiscae, 1523)
- Martin Luther, Invocavit Sermons (1523)
- Ulrich von Hutten, Ulrichi ab Hutten cum Erasmo Rotirodamo, Presbytero, Theologo, Expostulatio (1523)
- Hans Weiditz and Otto Brunfels, Herbarium Vivae Icones (late 1520s - early 1530s)
- Hildegard of Bingen, Physica (1533)
