= Battlefield medicine =

Medical treatment in or near combat

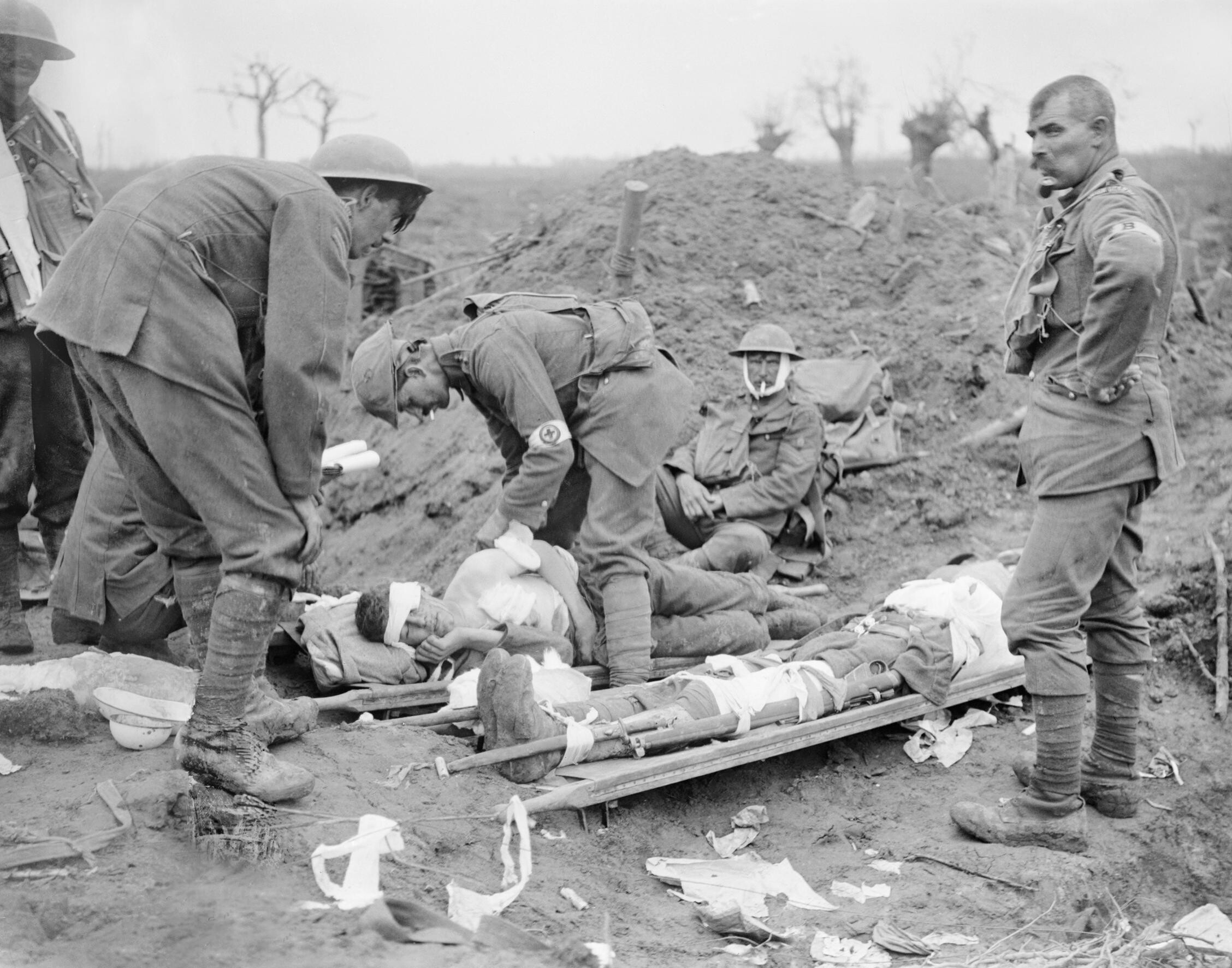
Combat medics attend to Irish casualties following the opening attack of the Battle of Passchendaele, 1917

Battlefield medicine, also known as field surgery and later combat casualty care, is the treatment of wounded combatants and non-combatants in or near an area of combat. Civilian medicine has been greatly advanced by procedures that were first developed to treat the wounds inflicted during combat. With the advent of advanced procedures and medical technology, even polytrauma can be survivable in modern wars. Battlefield medicine is a category of military medicine.

== History ==
=== Antiquity ===
During the 4th century BC, Alexander the Great (July 356 BC – June 323 BC) ran a lengthy military campaign, creating one the largest empires in history. During his military campaigns, tourniquets were used to slow the bleeding of wounded soldiers. Romans used them to control bleeding, especially during amputations. These tourniquets were narrow straps made of bronze, using leather only for comfort. In the 1st century BC, the Roman army used spider webs and honey-soaked bandages as field dressings. Wounds were packed with webs before being wrapped in honey-soaked bandages. The webs served as a natural fungicide while the honey staved off bacterial infection. Field healers provided wounded soldiers with amulets associated with their circumstances. This appears to have been effective for the combatant's mental health.

In 3rd century China, bamboo slips from the Han dynasty (202 BC – 9 AD) list injuries sustained by soldiers on the front line and from infighting. Illnesses related to the digestive and respiratory systems were also included. Medical treatment was limited and comprised such treatments as acupuncture, applications of plaster, and drugs, the latter being the most common. The practice of cranioplasty, or skull repair surgery, may have originated in pre-Incan Peru. Skulls with evidence of cranioplasty have been found more commonly in military burial grounds than residential ones, and primarily in male skeletons, suggesting the practice was mainly performed as a result of traumatic battle-related injury. Various materials were used to graft skull injuries, including non-natural and organic materials, such as gold and silver plates, shells and coconut.

=== Middle Ages ===
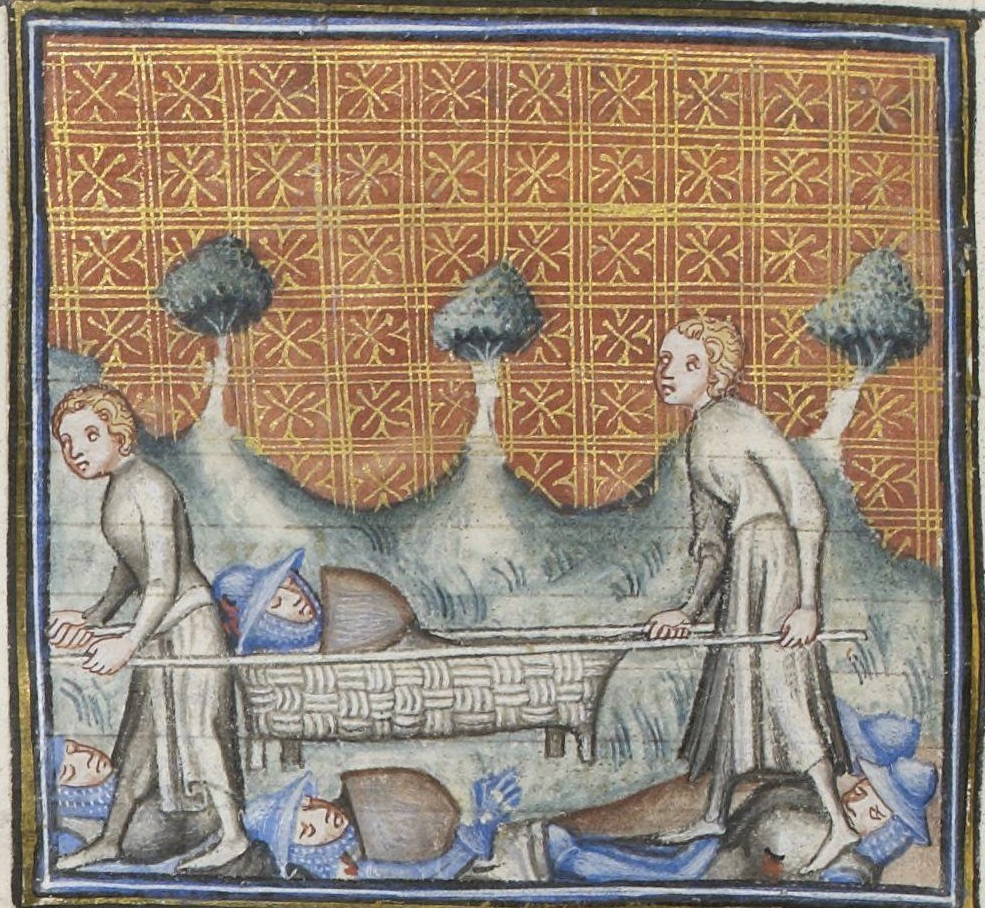
A wounded knight is carried on a medieval stretcher.

The Middle Ages saw further developments in battlefield medicine. The Crusades allowed for significant development of trauma surgery and military medicine. In 1112, the first king of the Crusaders ordered a hospital to be built. This hospital was shown to have military medicine uses after 750 patients were admitted in a 24-hour period after a battle in November 1177. This hospital utilized medicinal traditions from Schola Medica Salernitana, a prominent medieval medical school located in Salerno, such as examining the urine. The practices at the hospital were also influenced by Byzantine and Islamic methods. Despite these hospital systems and the recent invention of the tourniquet, most soldier fatalities on the battlefield were due to a fatal loss of blood. In order to return deceased crusaders' bodies home, practices like boiling the body to remove the bones, dissecting out important organs like the heart, and packing the body with salt were all common practices. This practice of dismemberment for transport occurred across Europe until a decree banning it was issued in 1299 by Pope Boniface III. However, it continued illegally after. Notably, crusaders performing such preservations learned a significantly better anatomical knowledge of the human body. As more soldiers were brought into the Crusades, more medical interventions for fatal blood loss were introduced. For example, texts from Islamic Spain describe an early cauterization method to stop arterial bleeding. This method involves using a hot olive cautery, a metal rod with an olive-shaped tip, to burn the artery shut. Performance of this procedure would be complicated by blood filling the site and making both the vessel and instruments slippery. Other evidence of surgical technology included an unspecified, specially designed surgical instrument for John Bradmore's removal of an arrow from Prince Henry's face after he was wounded in 1403 during the Battle of Shrewsbury. Another notable innovation with a modern counterpart is an early stretcher, likely made from wicker over a frame. This stretcher appears in a manuscript from c. 1380. Simple stretchers were commonly used in militaries through the middle of the 20th century. Ambulances as well were first used by Spanish soldiers during the Siege of Málaga in 1487, a part of the Reconquista campaigns to seize control of southern Spain. Authorized by Isabella I of Castile, the ambulances were largely ineffective, though they were perceived as critical to Spanish morale.

Battlefield medicine also appears in classical medieval texts such as Wolfram von Eschenbach's (1160/80 – c. 1220) Parzival, first published in 1210. Wolfram von Eschenbach was a German knight, poet and composer, regarded as one of the greatest German writers in national history. A scene in the book describes a wounded soldier with internal bleeding in his chest. The book explains that the soldier was thrown from his mount after being struck by a lance that pierced his shield. After, a procedure similar to a modern-day thoracostomy, inserting a tube into the chest to release blood or fluid, is described. A similar procedure done for an accumulation of pus in the chest was described as early as 460 BC, by Hippocrates, (460 BC – 370 BC) an influential medical figure from Kos. Galen (129 – 216 AD), another influential medical figure, describes the procedure roughly 500 years later again for pus and not blood.

=== Early modern period ===
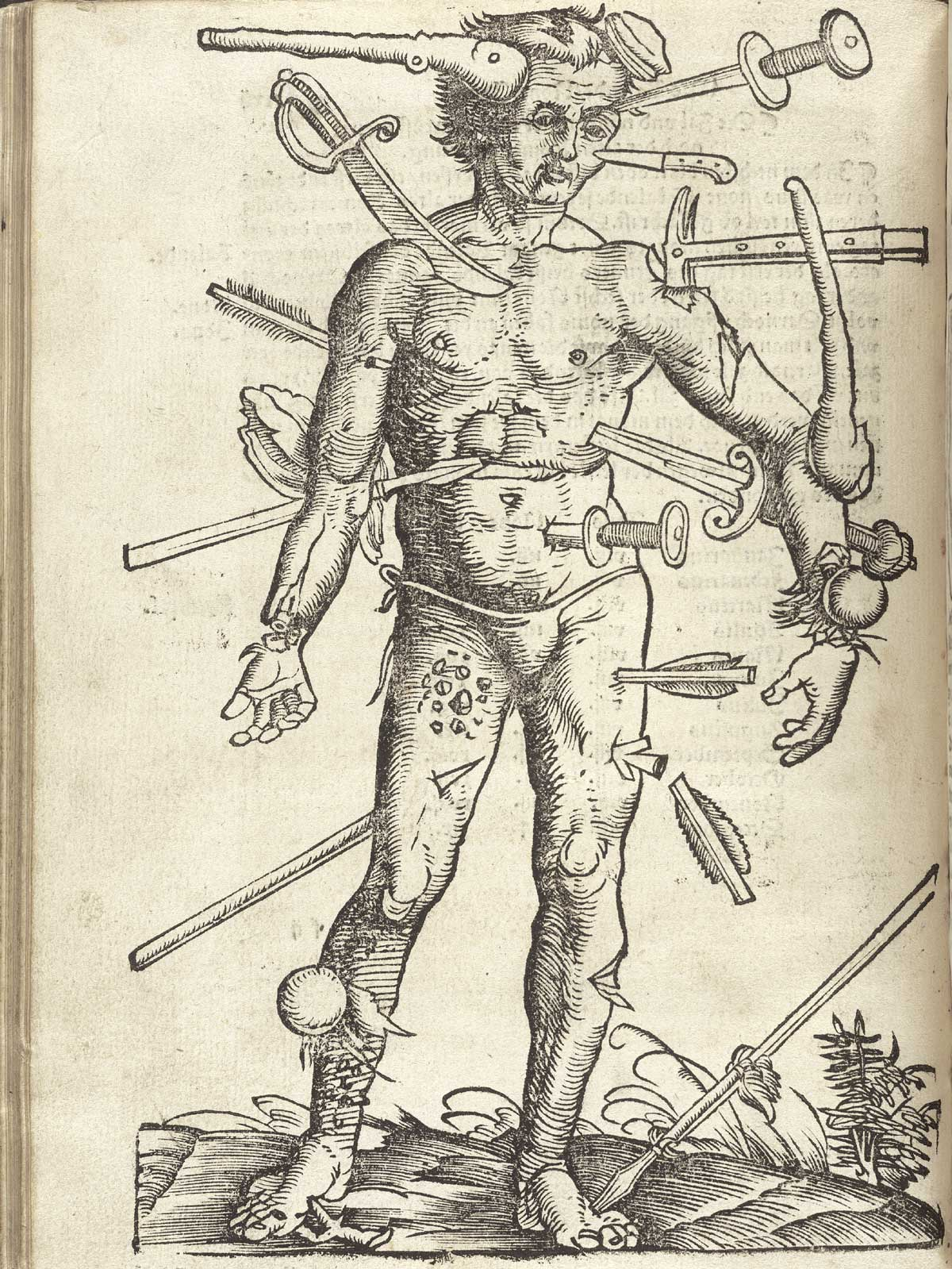
An illustration of the Wound Man, showing a variety of wounds from the Feldbuch der Wundarznei ('Field Manual for the Treatment of Wounds') written by Hans von Gersdorff in 1517 and illustrated by Hans Wechtlin.

The early modern period brought several large changes to the conduction of warfare, which in turn brought major developments to medicine. For one, political changes like the formation of nation-states meant that armies were now national institutions, and military medicine became an established professional field. Political conflict between emerging nation-states meant more organized warfare and larger conquests, both in duration and number of soldiers, thus requiring more surgeons and physicians to accompany. Social and cultural trends also impacted medicine and medical advancements. At the beginning of the 16th century, it was generally not socially accepted to alter the human body away from its natural form, even if that meant danger, or even death. Amputation was only accepted in cases of necrosis. Over the course of the 16th and 17th centuries, this convention gradually faded, allowing for more and more alterations to the body for the sake of health, including a gradual accepting of amputation as a lifesaving practice. Organized armies brought army surgeons along on their conquests; these surgeons were more specialized and more highly respected than civilian barber-surgeons, and they were trained to the same battle standards as soldiers, but better paid. Surgeons' social status grew significantly during this time, as the practical skills and handiness with tools was far more useful than a physician's knowledge of internal ailments in situations of dire injury. This rise in reputation was also seen as a result of surgeons treating noblemen and royalty in battle, then developing a lasting rapport with them.

==== Triage ====
Though the early modern period in general was associated with new military centralization, The Napoleonic Wars (1803–1815) brought never-before-seen centralization to battlefield medicine, as armies grew to large sizes of 100,000 or more. The practice of triage was pioneered by Dominique Jean Larrey, Napoleon Bonaparte's surgeon-in-chief of the Imperial Guard during the Napoleonic Wars. He also pioneered the use of ambulances in the midst of combat, called ambulances volantes ('flying ambulances'). Prior to this, military ambulances had waited for combat to cease before collecting the wounded by which time many casualties had succumbed to their injuries. Despite his valuable advances in treatment for the wounded, the conquest Larrey accompanied was an enormous failure for the French Empire, as factors outside of his control, starvation, epidemic disease, cold, caused unavoidably high casualties

==== Gunshot injuries ====
Warfare with gunpowder was rapidly becoming commonplace beginning in the early 16th century, a development that had many consequences for medicine. Prior to gunpowder weaponry, any injuries sustained in battle were caused by weapons driven by human force, and thus only caused simple fractures easily treated with non-invasive setting techniques. Newer, more powerful weapons brought more complex fractures and injuries involving projectile artillery debris that easily caused infections when removed from wounds without sterile technique. Further, guns enabled soldiers to become more accurate shots in shorter training times, leading to an increase in head injuries as soldiers aimed to cause maximal damage to their enemies' forces. In 1497, German surgeon Hieronymous Brunschwig (1450–1512) published the first known book discussing treatment of gunshot wounds and advocating for cauterization to stop bleeding, which at the time was performed with boiling oil. This practice was effective but painful, and also destroyed healthy tissue that would be necessary for forming amputation stumps. In the early 18th century, new developments like the invention of the screw-type tourniquet (Jean Louis Petit, 1718), forceps as means of removing bullets, and wound debridement meant even safer treatment of critical battlefield wounds.

==== Amputation and prosthetic limbs ====
Given the changes described above, conversations amongst surgeons on nuances of amputation, such as methods of stopping bleeding, grew. French military surgeon Ambroise Paré (1510–1590) pioneered modern battlefield wound treatment and mainly contributed to the use of dressing to treat wounds and the use of ligature to stop bleeding during amputation. His advocation for ligature, as well as his invention of a precursor to the modern hemostat, was critical for enabling amputation to become commonplace, as before it was not possible to create stumps without risk of hemorrhage. When he first began his career as a military doctor, he did follow the tradition of cauterization, but eventually ran out of oil, leading him to turn to more experimental techniques. He developed an experimental medication to treat wounds with a solution of egg yolk, rose oil, and turpentine, and noted his surprise to find that it (along with ligature) reduced pain and inflammation in his soldiers.

Paré's strong defense of ligature over cauterization contested Brunschwig's doctrine, but also re-ignited ideas first proposed by much older medical authorities like Galen and Gui de Chauliac, both proponents of ligature for stopping bleeding of all wounds. Prior to Paré's interventions, it was believed that gunpowder was poisonous and that cauterization was necessary to burn the poison away, but Paré proposed, controversially, that people who died of gunshot wounds in fact died because of tissue death and wound severity, not poison, thus any method of stopping bleeding (i.e. ligature) would be sufficient. Paré also made contributions to neuroscience; in his 1545 publication on wounds, "The Method of Curing Wounds Caused by Arquebus and Firearms", he pays special attention to head wounds, and he was also one of the first documented medics to comment on concussion.

With amputations becoming more common, prosthetic limb development also become more common. Notably, only among members of society with considerable wealth. An early modern German knight, Götz von Berlichingen (1480–1562), wrote a series of memoirs describing the aftermath of the loss of his right hand in 1504 when a piece of his own sword, shattered by a culverin (small handgun) wedged itself into his wrist, effectively severing it. In the Berlichingen family collection, historians found two prosthetic right hands assumed to belong to him. One of the hands is larger and contains an iron sleeve connecting to the wearer all the way to the elbow. The smaller, simpler hand has holes near the wrist, presumably for attachment with a cord. Fingers had limited range of motion and only by moving with the other, intact hand (i.e. to set the prosthetic to grip a weapon); but aesthetically, the fingers were complex, decorated with engraved wrinkles and fingernails, and painted to mimic skin tone.

==== Cranioplasty ====
In 1505, Ibrahim bin Abdullah, an Ottoman subject assumed to be an army surgeon, wrote a surgical textbook called Alâim-i Cerrâhîn on various surgical topics. He included early guidance on gunshot wound treatment and treating broken bones. For a fractured skull, he suggests cranioplasty using grafts from the skulls of young goats or Kangal dogs. He notes that these should be precisely measured to match the size of the injury and held with firm dressing in the recipient's head until the scalp heals over the graft. Using goats and dogs as graft donors was suitable in a military context because they were already brought along with troops for both food and protection, meaning they were quickly available in case of a battlefield injury. At the same time in Europe, Italian Catholic anatomist Gabriele Falloppio (1522–1562) was also gaining experience with cranioplasty. He stated that a bone replacement is possible only if the dura mater (a thick protective membrane surrounding the brain) is not affected by the injury. if it is, the entire injured bone should be replaced with a gold plate. Later on in 1668, an anecdotal account of a cranioplasty with a graft from a dog skull was published by Dutch surgeon Job Janszoon van Meekeren (1611–1666) following a Russian nobleman's sword-inflicted wound to the skull. This was a controversial procedure with the church; the nobleman is said to have been threatened with excommunication for having an animal part in his body.

=== 18th and 19th centuries ===
The 18th and 19th centuries saw further wartime opportunity to improve and innovate battlefield medical care, partially due to a comparatively rapid pace of scientific advancement parallel to medicine and war. Notably, antiseptic technique was first conceived during this time period, which greatly improved patient outcomes in surgery. Sir John Pringle (1707–1782) was a university-educated doctor and the physician general to the British army. In 1752, he published a book on diseases faced by soldiers, including dysentery and typhus. He was one of the first thinkers to discuss antiseptic technique, and his ideas on avoiding infection and epidemics in armies were effective, even thought he was not aware of the underlying causes. During the American Civil War, Jonathan Letterman modernized medical organization on the battlefield for the Union. Following his appointment as the Medical Director of the Army of the Potomac, Letterman founded an ambulance corps staffed with permanent and trained attendants which was later compounded in efficacy by the organization of hospital echelons and tent hospitals in the war's eastern theater. His contributions led to his being recognized as the "father of battlefield medicine".

During this time, the Relief Society for Wounded Soldiers, forerunner of the International Committee of the Red Cross (ICRC) was founded in 1863 in Geneva. The ICRC advocated for the establishment of national aid societies for battlefield medical relief, and stood behind the First Geneva Convention of 1864 which provided neutrality for medics, ambulances, and hospitals. In the late 19th century, the influence of notable medical practitioners like Friedrich von Esmarch and members of the Venerable Order of Saint John pushing for every adult man and woman to be taught the basics of first aid eventually led to institutionalized first-aid courses amongst the military and standard first-aid kits for every soldier.

===== Battlefield Medicine Reforms Under Jonathan Letterman =====
In June 1862, Jonathan Letterman was assigned to the role of medical director of the Army of Potomac and started a set of reforms that still impact many aspects of battlefield medicine today. Letterman reforms started with moving the sick and injured soldiers away from active battlefields. He enforced the use of proper waste disposal, managed the way food was prepared and cleaned, advocated for clean uniforms, rebuilt the barracks, and provided more nutritious meals for soldiers. This change to sanitation & hygiene led to a decrease in disease rate in the Army. Also, more on the reforms were the establishment of what is known as the U.S. Ambulance Corps that was responsible for locating and transporting wounded soldiers on the battlefield.

=== 20th and 21st centuries ===
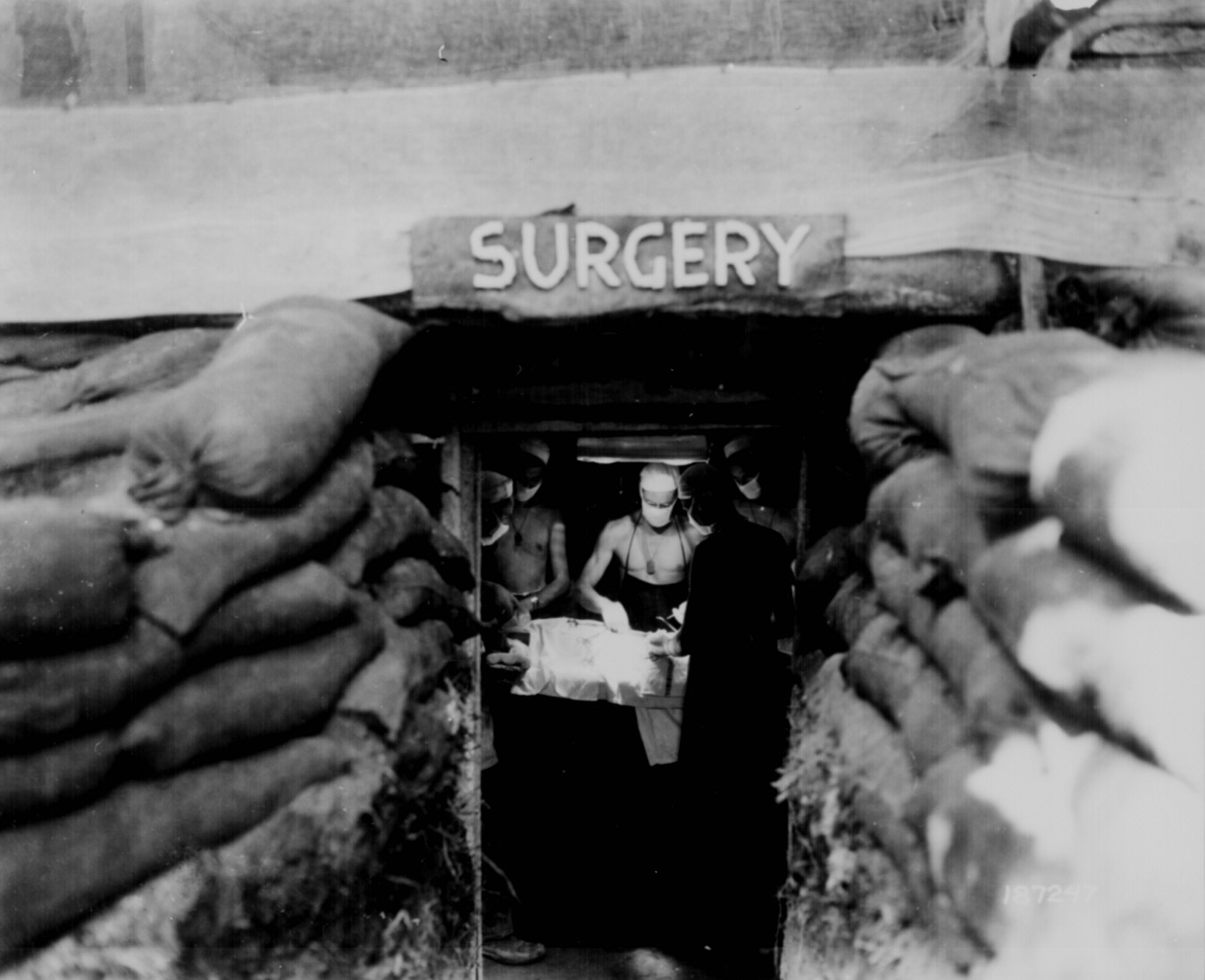
An American soldier, wounded by a Japanese sniper, undergoes surgery during the Bougainville campaign in World War II.

- Advances in surgery – especially amputation – during the Napoleonic Wars and First World War during the Battle of the Somme.
- Medical advances also provided kinder methods for treatment of battlefield injuries, such as antiseptic ointments, which replaced boiling oil for cauterizing amputations.
- Advances in understanding of Germ Theory and Asepsis as well as the introduction of High Explosive Artillery and Machine Gun filled Trench Warfare lead to conditions primed for better battlefield wound care. One such advance was the Carrel-Dakin Technique. This was developed by many but namely involved Alexis Carrel. This involved initial cleaning/Debridement of the wound, followed by irrigation with Dakin's Solution (Essentially dilute Aqueous Sodium Hypochlorite a solution developed by Henry Dakin). This cleaned the wound of dead tissue and pathogen contaminated soil, as well as aided in drainage of Pus etc.
  - "During the Battle of Champagne in 1915, 80% of the wounded were infected with gas gangrene bacteria. A year later, when surgeons applied the Carrel-Dakin technique during the Battle of the Somme, that number was 20%"
- During the Spanish Civil War there were two major advances. The first one was the invention of a practical method for transporting blood. Developed in Barcelona by Duran i Jordà, the technique mixed the blood of the donors with the same blood type and then, using Grifols glass tubes and a refrigerator truck, transported the blood to the front line. A few weeks later Norman Bethune developed a similar service. The second advance was the invention of the mobile operating room by the Catalan Moisès Broggi, who worked for the International Brigades.
- The establishment of fully equipped and mobile field hospitals such as the Mobile Army Surgical Hospital (MASH) was first practiced by the United States in World War II. It was succeeded in 2006 by the Combat Support Hospital.
- The use of helicopters as ambulances, or aeromedical evacuation, was first practiced in Burma in 1944. The first MEDEVAC under fire was done in Manila in 1945 where over seventy troops were extracted in five helicopters, one and two casualties at a time.
- The extension of emergency medicine to pre-hospital settings through the use of emergency medical technicians.
- The use of remote physiological monitoring devices on soldiers to show vital signs and biomechanical data to the medic and MEDEVAC crew before and during trauma. This allows medicine and treatment to be administered as soon as possible in the field and during extraction. Similar telemetry units are used in crewed spaceflight, where a flight surgeon at the Command Center can monitor vital signs. This can help to see issues before larger problems occur, such as elevated carbon dioxide levels, or a rise in body temperature indicating a possible infection.

== History of Tactical Combat Casualty Care (TCCC) ==
In 1989, the Commander of the Naval Special Warfare Command (NAVSPECWARCOM) established a research program to conduct studies on medical and physiologic issues. The research concluded that extremity hemorrhage was a leading cause of preventable death in the battlefield. At that time, proper care and treatment was not provided immediately which often resulted in death. This insight prompted a systematic reevaluation of all aspects of battlefield trauma care that was conducted from 1993 to 1996 as a joint effort by special operations medical personnel and the Uniformed Services University of the Health Sciences. Through this 3-year research, the first version of the TCCC guidelines were created to train soldiers to provide effective intervention on the battlefield. The TCCC aims to combine good medicine with good small-unit tactics. One very important aspect that the TCCC outlined was the use of tourniquets, initially there was a belief that the use of tourniquets led to the preventable loss of an extremity due to ischemia but after careful literature search the committee arrived at the conclusion that there was not enough information out there to confirm this claim. The TCCC therefore outline the appropriate usage of tourniquets to provide effective first aid on the battlefield.

After the TCCC article was published in 1996, the program undertook 4 parallel efforts during the next 5-year period. These efforts are as follows:

1. Presenting TCCC concepts to senior Department of Defense (DoD) line and medical leaders and advocating for their use.
2. Identifying and developing responses to representative types of TCCC casualty scenarios.
3. Initiating TCCC's first strategic partnership with civilian trauma organizations—the Prehospital Trauma Life Support (PHTLS) Committee, the National Association of Emergency Medical Technicians (NAEMT), and the American College of Surgeons Committee on Trauma (ACS-COT).
4. Expanding TCCC training beyond medical personnel to include SEAL and 75th Ranger Regiment combat leaders and nonmedical unit members.

== Modern applications ==
Over the past decade combat medicine has improved drastically. Everything has been given a complete overhaul from the training to the gear. In 2011, all enlisted military medical training for the U.S. Navy, Air Force, and Army were located under one command, the Medical Education and Training Campus (METC). After attending a basic medical course there (which is similar to a civilian EMT course), the students go on to advanced training in Tactical Combat Casualty Care.

=== Tactical combat casualty care (TCCC) ===
Tactical combat casualty care is becoming the standard of care for the tactical management of combat casualties within the Department of Defense and is the sole standard of care endorsed by both the American College of Surgeons and the National Association of EMT's for casualty management in tactical environments.

Tactical combat casualty care is built around three definitive phases of casualty care:

1. Care Under Fire: Care rendered at the scene of the injury while both the medic and the casualty are under hostile fire. Available medical equipment is limited to that carried by each operator and the medic. This stage focuses on a quick assessment, and placing a tourniquet on any major bleed.
2. Tactical Field Care: Rendered once the casualty is no longer under hostile fire. Medical equipment is still limited to that carried into the field by mission personnel. Time prior to evacuation may range from a few minutes to many hours. Care here may include advanced airway treatment, IV therapy, etc. The treatment rendered varies depending on the skill level of the provider as well as the supplies available. This is when a corpsman/medic will make a triage and evacuation decision.
3. Tactical Evacuation Care (TACEVAC): Rendered while the casualty is evacuated to a higher echelon of care. Any additional personnel and medical equipment pre-staged in these assets will be available during this phase.

Since "90% of combat deaths occur on the battlefield before the casualty ever reaches a medical treatment facility" (Col. Ron Bellamy) TCCC focuses training on major hemorrhaging and airway complications such as a tension-pneumothorax. This has driven the casualty fatality rate down to less than 9%.

=== Interventions used ===
Listed below are interventions that a TCCC provider may be expected to perform depending on the phase of TCCC they are at and their level of training. This list is not comprehensive and may be subject to change with future revisions in TCCC guidelines.

Hemorrhage control interventions include the use of extremity tourniquets, junctional tourniquets, trauma dressings, wound packing with compressed gauze and hemostatic dressings, and direct pressure. Newer devices approved for use by the CoTCCC for hemorrhage control include the iTClamp and XStat. Pharmacological options also include tranexamic acid, and hemostatic agents such as zeolite and chitosan.

In managing a casualty's airway, a TCCC provider may position the casualty in the recovery position or utilize airway adjuncts such as nasopharyngeal airways, oropharyngeal airways, and supraglottic airways. They may also utilize the jaw thrust and head-tilt/ chin-lift maneuver to open a casualty's airway. Advanced TCCC providers may also perform endotracheal intubation and cricothyroidotomy.

Respiratory management largely revolves around the use of chest seals, vented and unvented, and needle decompressions to manage tension pneumothoraxes.

In circulation management a TCCC provider may obtain intravenous/ intraosseous access for the administration of fluids such as normal saline, lactated Ringer's solution, whole blood, and colloids and plasma substitutes for fluid resuscitation. This also provides a route for the administration of other drugs in accordance with the provider's scope of practice.

Head injuries would indicate for cervical spine immobilization to the best of the provider's abilities if deemed appropriate in a given setting, or the use of devices such as a cervical collar.

As trauma-induced hypothermia is a leading cause of battlefield deaths, a provider may also perform hypothermia prevention can be accomplished through the use of a Hypothermia Prevention and Management Kit or emergency blanket, the placement of a casualty on an insulated surface, and the removal of wet clothing from a casualty's body.

=== Care under fire ===
Care under fire is care provided at the point of injury immediately upon wounding while the casualty and care provider remain under effective hostile fire. The casualty should be encouraged to provide self-aid and remain engaged in the firefight if possible. If unable to do so, the casualty should be encouraged to move behind cover or "play dead". Due to the high risk of injury to the care-provider and limited resources at this phase, care provided to the casualty should be limited to controlling life-threatening hemorrhage with tourniquets and preventing airway obstruction by placing casualty in the recovery position. The primary focus during care under fire should be winning the firefight to prevent further casualties and further wounding of existing casualties.

=== Tactical field care ===
Tactical field care phase begins when the casualty and care-provider are no longer under imminent threat of injury by hostile actions. Though the level of danger is lessened, care-providers should exercise caution and maintain good situational awareness as the tactical situation may be fluid and subject to change. The tactical field care phase enables the provision of more comprehensive care according to care providers' levels of training, tactical considerations, and available resources. Major tasks that are to be completed in the tactical field care phase include the rapid trauma survey, the triage of all casualties, and the transport decision.

=== Tactical evacuation care ===
Tactical evacuation care refers to care provided when a casualty is being evacuated and en route to higher levels of medical care. Care providers at this phase are at even less risk of imminent harm as result of hostile actions. Due to improved access to resources and the tactical situation, more advanced interventions can be provided to casualties such as endotracheal intubation. Patient re-assessments and the addressing of issues that were not or were inadequately addressed previously are also major components of this phase.

In tactical evacuation (TACEVAC), casualties are moved from a hostile environment to a safer and more secure location to receive advanced medical care. Tactical evacuation techniques use a combination of air, ground and water units to conduct the mission depending on the location of the incident and medical centres. Ground vehicle evacuations are more prevalent in urban locations that are in close proximity to medical facilities. Requests for evacuation of casualties and pertinent information are typically communicated through 9-Line MEDEVAC and MIST reports.

Tactical evaluation is an umbrella term that encompasses both medical evacuation (MEDEVAC) and casualty evacuation (CASEVAC). Medical evacuation platforms are typically not engaged in combat except in self-defence and defence of patients. MEDEVAC takes place using special dedicated medical assets marked with a red cross. Casualty evacuation is through non-medical platforms and may include a Quick-Reaction force aided by air support.

For aircraft involved TACEVAC situations there are many considerations that need to be accounted for. Firstly, the flying rules vary widely depending on the aircraft and units in play. The list of determinants to create the TACEVAC strategy include the distances and altitudes involved, time of day, passenger capacity, hostile threat, availability of medical equipment/personnel, and icing conditions. As mentioned TACEVAC is more advanced than TCCC, it also includes training to/for:

- improve breathing
- provide supplemental oxygen
- administer Tranexamic acid (TXA)
- deal with traumatic brain injuries
- fluid resuscitation
- blood product administration
- blood transfusion
- preventing and treating hypothermia

=== Canadian armed forces ===
There are three levels of tactical combat casualty care providers in the Canadian Armed Forces.

==== Combat first aid ====
Every soldier receives a two-day combat first aid training course. The course focuses on treating hemorrhages, using tourniquets and applying dressings, and basic training for casualty management.

==== Tactical combat casualty care ====
A select number of soldiers are chosen to participate in an intense 2-week tactical combat casualty care course where soldiers are provided with additional training. Overall, they are trained to work as medic extenders since they work under the direction of medics.

==== Tactical medicine ====
The tactical medicine (TACMED) course is offered exclusively to medics. The tactical medicine program provides training for advanced tactical combat casualty care and is the highest level of care provided by the Canadian Armed Forces in a battlefield setting. Medics are trained to treat and manage patients using the MARCHE protocol. The MARCHE protocol prioritizes potential preventable causes of death in warfare as follows:

1. Massive hemorrhage control
2. Airway management
3. Respiratory management
4. Circulation
  1. Bleeding control
  2. Intravenous (IV)/ intraosseous (IO) access
  3. Fluid resuscitation
  4. Tourniquet reassessment
5. Hypothermia prevention
6. Head injuries
7. Eye injuries
8. Everything else
  1. Monitor patient
  2. Pain management
  3. Head-to-toe assessment
  4. Address all wounds found
  5. Antibiotics
  6. Tactical evacuation preparation
  7. Documentation of care and findings

=== United States ===
==== Care under fire ====
Care under fire happens at the point of injury. According to tactical combat casualty care guidelines, the most effective way to reduce further morbidity and mortality is to return fire at enemy combatants by all personnel. The priority is to continue the combat mission, gain fire superiority, and then treat casualties. The only medical treatment rendered in care under fire is the application of direct pressure on massive bleeding. Tactical combat casualty care recommends a tourniquet as the single most important treatment at the point of injury. It is recommended during care under fire to quickly place tourniquets over clothing, high, and tight; the tourniquet should be reassessed when out of danger in the tactical field care phase.

==== Tactical field care ====
Tactical field care is considered to be the backbone of Tactical Combat Casualty Care and consists of care rendered by first responders or prehospital medical personnel while still in the tactical environment. The acronyms MARCH and PAWS help personnel remember crucial treatment steps while under duress.

===== MARCH =====
The MARCH acronym is used by personnel to remember the proper order of treatment for casualties.

Massive hemorrhage. The most potentially survivable cause of death is hemorrhage from extremity bleeds, however more than 90% of 4596 combat mortalities post September 11, 2001 died of hemorrhage associated injuries. It is recommended to apply a Committee on Tactical Combat Casualty Care (CoTCCC) approved tourniquet for any life-threatening extremity hemorrhages. Tourniquets during tactical field care should be placed under clothing 2 to 3 inches above the wound, with application time written on the tourniquet.

Airway. Non-patent or closed airway is another survivable cause of death. Airway injuries typically occur due to inhalation burns or maxillofacial trauma. If a person is conscious and speaking they have a patent open airway, while nasopharyngeal airway could benefit those who are unconscious and breathing. However, unconscious casualties who are not breathing could require surgical cricothyroidotomy, as endotracheal intubation is highly difficult in tactical settings.

Respirations. Tension pneumothorax (PTX) develops when air trapped in the chest cavity displaces functional lung tissue and puts pressure on the heart causing cardiac arrest. Thus, open chest wounds must be sealed using a vented chest seal. Tension pneumothorax should be decompressed using a needle chest decompression (NCD) with a 14 gauge, 3.25 inch needle with a catheter. Ventilation and/or oxygenation should be supported as required.

Circulation. It is more important to stem the flow of bleeding than to infuse fluids, and only casualties in shock or those who need intravenous (IV) medications should have IV access. Signs of shock include unconsciousness or altered mental status, and/or abnormal radial pulse. IV should be applied using an 18 gauge catheter and saline lock in tactical field care, secured by transparent would-dressing film. Tranexamic acid (TXA) should be given as soon as possible to casualties in or at risk of hemorrhagic shock. An intraosseous (IO) device could also be used for administering fluids if IV access is not feasible.

Head injury/hypothermia. Secondary brain injury is worsened by hypotension (systolic blood pressure under 90 mmHg), hypoxia (peripheral capillary oxygen saturation under 90%), and hypothermia (whole body temperature below 95 Fahrenheit or 35 Celsius). Medical personnel can use the Military Acute Concussion Evaluation (MACE), while non-medical personnel can use the alert, verbal, pain, unresponsive (AVPU) scale to identify traumatic brain injury. The "lethal triad" is a combination of hypothermia, acidosis, and coagulopathy in trauma patients. Since hypothermia can occur regardless of ambient temperature due to blood loss, the Hypothermia Prevention and Management Kit (HPMK) is recommended for all casualties.

===== PAWS =====
The PAWS acronym is used by personnel to remember additional casualty care items that should be addressed.

Pain. Proper management of pain reduces stress on a casualty's mind and body, and have reduced incidents of post-traumatic stress disorder (PTSD). Pain management is shown to reduce harmful patient movement, improves compliance and cooperation, and allows for easier transport as well as improved health outcomes.

Antibiotics. All battlefield wounds are considered contaminated, and thus any penetrating injury should receive antibiotics at the point of injury as well as in tactical field care. The recommended parenteral antibiotics are 1g ertapenem or 2g cefotetan, which can treat multi drug-resistant bacteria. if the casualty can tolerate oral fluids, 400 mg moxifloxacin can be administered orally instead of ertapenem or cefotetan.

Wounds. Assessing the casualty for additional wounds improves morbidity and mortality. First responders must address burns, open fractures, facial trauma, amputation dressings, and security of tourniquets. Prior to movement, reassessment of wounds and interventions is very important. Casualties with penetrating trauma to the chest or abdomen should receive priority evacuation due to the possibility of internal hemorrhage.

Splinting. Explosions (such as from improvised explosive device or land mines) that cause lower extremity traumatic amputation cause forces to move upward through the body, which may cause further bone disruption, hollow organ collapse, or internal bleeding. Thus, first responders should use the Combat Ready Clamp (CRoC), the Junctional Emergency Treatment Tool (JETT), or the SAM Junctional Tourniquet to control junctional hemorrhage and stabilize the pelvis. In cases of penetrative eye trauma, responders should first perform a rapid field test of visual acuity, then tape a rigid shield over the eye to prevent further damage, and also give 400 mg oral moxifloxacin as soon as possible. Pressure must never by applied to an eye suspected of penetrative injury.

== Evaluating effectiveness ==
In order to evaluate the effectiveness of Tactical Combat Casualty Care, a study was conducted which analyzed US military casualties who died from an injury that occurred while they were deployed to Afghanistan or Iraq from October 2001 to June 2011. Of the 4,596 casualties, 87% died in the pre-medical treatment facility, prior to receiving surgical care. Of the casualties in the pre-medical treatment facility, 75.7% of the prehospital deaths were non-survivable, while 24.3% of deaths were potentially survivable. Instantaneous non-survivable mortalities included physical dismemberment, catastrophic brain injury, and destructive cardiovascular injury. Non-instantaneous non-survivable mortalities included severe traumatic brain injury, thoracic vascular injury, high spinal cord injury, and destructive abdominal pelvic injury. These injuries are very difficult to treat given currently fielded medical therapies such as Tactical Combat Casualty Care.

In terms of potentially survivable mortalities, 8.0% of mortalities were associated with airway obstruction. Majority of mortalities (90.9%) which were classified as potentially survivable mortalities were attributed to hemorrhage, with 67.3% of the hemorrhage being truncal, 19.2% junctional, and 13.5% extremity. During the study period, there were no effective protocols put in place to control junctional or truncal sources of hemorrhage in the battlefield, which suggests a gap in medical treatment capability.

This study shows the majority of battlefield casualties which occur prior to receiving surgical care are non-survivable. However, of the casualties which are survivable, the majority of deaths can be attributed to hemorrhages. Developing protocol which can control and temporize hemorrhage in the battlefield would improve the effectiveness of Tactical Combat Casualty Care, and decreases the number of casualties in the battlefield.

Another study analyzed the effectiveness of tourniquets for hemorrhage control, which are used in Tactical Combat Casualty Care. A four-year retrospective analysis showed that out of 91 soldiers who were treated with tourniquets, 78% of tourniquets were applied effectively. The success rate for tourniquets applied to upper limbs was 94% while the success rate for tourniquets applied to lower limbs was 71%. The difference between the success rates can be attributed to the tourniquets themselves, as in another study, tourniquets applied on healthy volunteers resulted in a much lower success rate for lower limbs in comparison to upper limbs. Therefore, the tourniquets themselves can be redesigned to increase its effectiveness and improve Tactical Combat Casualty Care.

A prospective study of all trauma patients treated at the Canadian-led Role 3 multinational medical unit (Role 3 MMU) established at Kandahar Airfield Base between February 7, 2006, to May 20, 2006, was conducted to examine how Tactical Combat Casualty Care interventions are delivered. The study concluded that tourniquets are effective, but must be used appropriately. The distinction between venous and arterial tourniquets must be reinforced in Tactical Combat Casualty Care training. Tactical Combat Casualty Care courses must also train soldiers to remove tourniquets for the purposes of reassessing trauma after the patient and caregiver is no longer under enemy fire. This is because the risks of iatrogenic ischemic injury of prolonged use of tourniquets outweigh the risks of increased blood loss.

The study also identified technical errors in performing needle decompressions. All needle decompressions were performed at least 2 cm (0.8 in) medial to the mid-clavicular line and well within the cardiac box. This may result in injury to the heart and surrounding vasculature. Tactical Combat Casualty Care training must reinforce using landmarks when performing needle decompressions. This is especially useful since soldiers may have to perform this procedure in poor lighting conditions.

== See also ==
- Military medicine
- Medical corps
- Combat medic
- Aid station
- History of medicine
- Timeline of medicine and medical technology
- Textbook of Military Medicine
- Medical Education and Training Campus
- CASEVAC
- National Association of Emergency Medical Technicians
