= Martin Schott =

Book printer

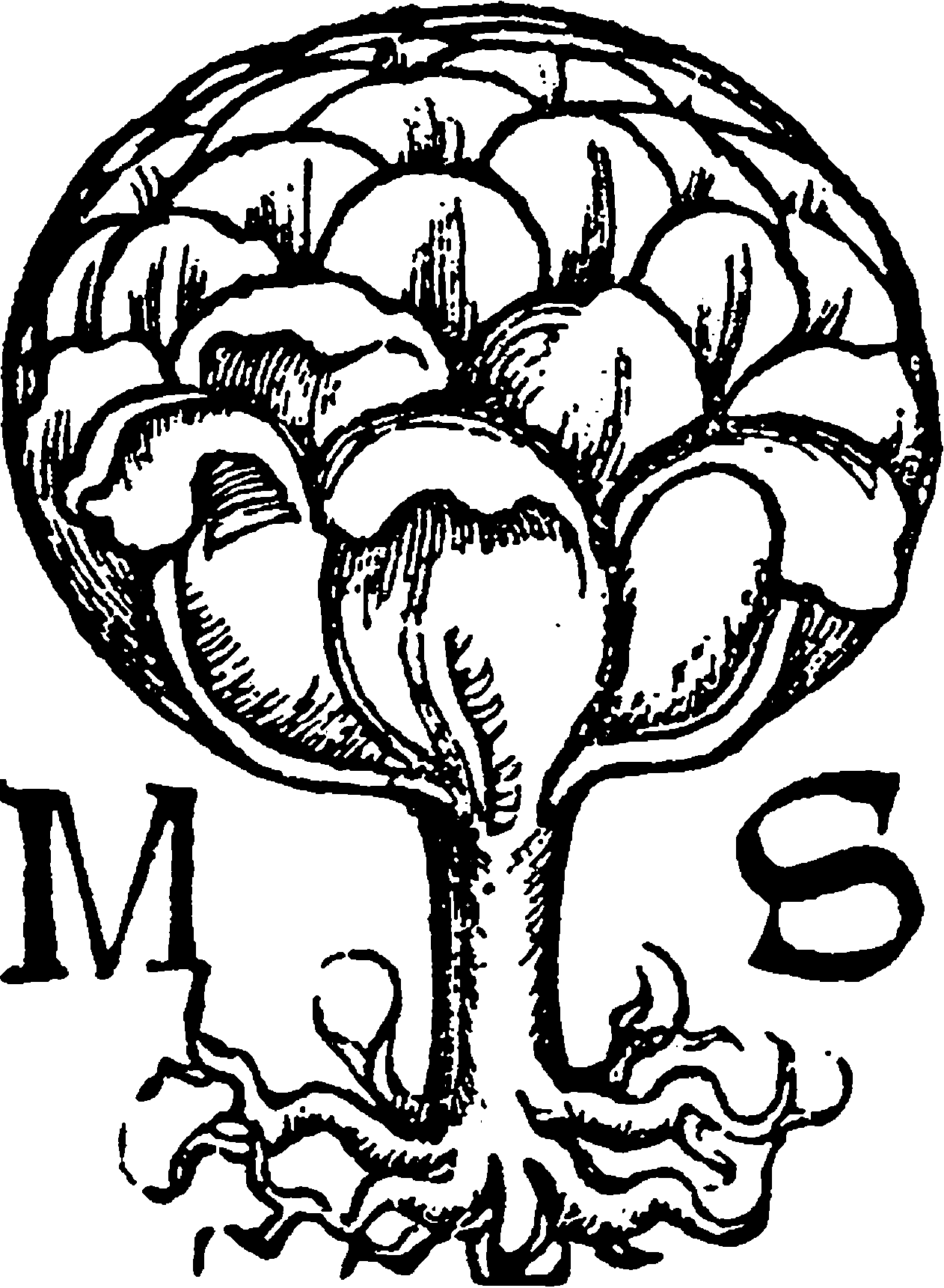
Martin Schott's printer's mark, 1498

Martin Schott (died 22 November 1499) was a book printer from Strasbourg. One of the earliest printers in Strasbourg, his catalog reflected the tastes of the higher classes in Germany at the time of German humanism.

== Biography ==
Schott hailed from a high-ranking family. He was the son of Friedrich Schott, a woodcutter and sculptor. His father's interest, and his marriage to a daughter of the printer Johannes Mentelin, may have led him to become a printer. He did not inherit his father in law's business, which went to another son in law of Mentelin's, Adolf Rusch. In contrast to Mentelin's company, Schott used a more modern (but sometimes less attractive) process. His first known printing was a plenarium, in 1481; his last was the version of Cicero's Philippicae by the early German humanist Jakob Wimpfeling, in 1498. It is sure, however, that he must have been printing works before 1480; given the paucity of the research into Strasbourg's history of printing, these chronological limits as well as the number of his books cannot be precisely determined, according to the Deutsche Biographie. Twenty-one, or perhaps twenty-five, books are known to have come from his press, but it may be that not all his books were printed under his own name, and the large number of incunables printed in Strasbourg also suggest he may have printed some of those. The Lucidarius, a 12th-century summa, may have been the earliest of his books. While he printed a small number of books, they were voluminous, and Schott clearly valued artistic embellishment.

His catalog reflected the interest of the established classes in Strasbourg at the time of German humanism, and contained German versions of a biography of Alexander the Great, of Guido delle Colonne's Historia destructionis Troiae, and of the 11th-century encyclopedia Elucidarium (a source for the Lucidarium). He also printed Latin works. His printer's mark was a tree not planted in any soil and displayed in full, with the letters "M. S.". His son, Johannes Schott, was likewise a printer. The first book known to be his work was printed in 1500, and he printed work from Martin Luther and other reformers throughout his career.
