= Indagine =

Indagine (also ab Indagine, de Indagine) is a Latinized last name, derived from the Latin word for "investigation" or sign".

Notable people with the last name include:

- Johannes de Indagine (Benedictine) (d. 1469), German Benedictine monk and abbot
- Johannes de Indagine (1415–1475), German monk and theologian
- Johannes Indagine (1467-1537), German humanist and priest
