= Heinrich Eggestein =

German printer

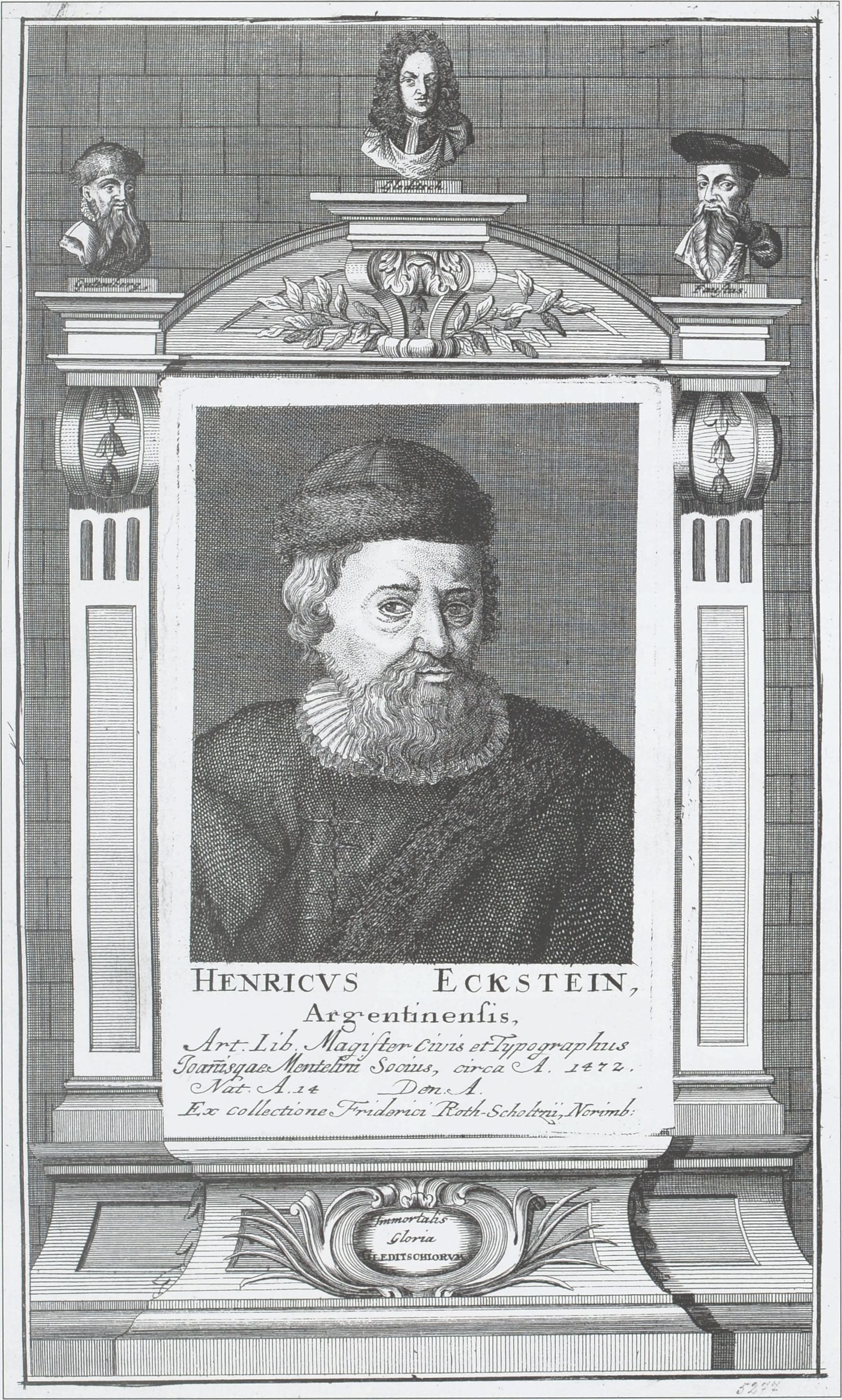
Portrait of Henrich Eggestein

Heinrich Eggestein (born around 1415/1420 in Rosheim, Alsace; died 1488 or later; also spelled Eckstein or Eggesteyn) is considered, along with Johannes Mentelin, to be the earliest book printer in Strasbourg and therefore one of the earliest anywhere in Europe outside Mainz.

== Career ==
Before he came to Strasbourg in the beginning of the 1440s, Heinrich Eggestein had already acquired the academic degree of a Magister artium liberalium at a university which is still unknown. Already shortly after his arrival, he entered the service of Bishop Rupert of Palatinate-Simmern and held the office of Siegelbewahrer (keeper of the seal, also called Insiegler or Siegelträger) at the Strasbourg provost court.

Eggestein got some rights of a Strasbourg citizen in 1442. It is assumed that Eggestein became personally acquainted with Johannes Gutenberg, the later inventor of printing books with movable type, during his stay in Strasbourg in the 1440s. It is highly likely that Eggestein even travelled to Mainz himself in the 1450s to learn the art of book printing from Gutenberg. Eggestein probably arrived in Mainz after the break between Gutenberg and Johann Fust.

Eggestein's return to Strasbourg is certainly verified, as he got the rights of citizenship on 9 August 1459. The decision to found his own printery may have been made in the time around 1464, when Eggestein lost his office of Siegelbewahrer. On 31 March 1466, the printer received a Schutzbrief of the Prince-elector Frederick I of the Palatinate, giving him special protection, somewhat like a patent.

In 1470, Eggestein resided in Strasbourg and printed the second as well as the third edition of the German language bible, which had first been printed by Johannes Mentelin.

== Death ==
Although his printery was quickly able to establish itself in the market, Eggestein got into financial difficulties towards the end of the 1470s. He was indebted to the Basel paper merchant, Anton Galliciani, and was successfully sued by him in 1480 for the immediate payment of all outstanding debts. Eggestein was no longer mentioned after 1488. The date and circumstances of his death are unknown.

== Printings ==
Heinrich Eggestein's activities as a book printer can be established from 1464 until 1488. During these 25 years, he published a wealth of printed works with varied content. After his first work, the Bible of 1466 which has already been mentioned, he printed two further Latin folio editions of the Holy Scriptures. In this connection, the Strasbourg printer also used modern marketing methods.

At the beginning of the 1470s, Eggestein began to expand his printing and publishing range. Besides works of theology, Eggestein increasingly printed legal works of canon law and civil law, such as the Decretum Gratiani (1471), as well as the Decretales of Gregory IX and the Constitutiones of Pope Clement V. That put him in direct competition with Peter Schöffer, who also issued legal titles in on a large scale. Furthermore, Eggestein printed antique classics such as Virgil's Bucolica, Cicero's De officiis, and Julius Caesar's De bello gallico. Eggestein directed his special interest at Latin works of medieval authors. Thus he published the Legenda aurea of Jacobus de Voragine, De miseria conditionis humanae by Pope Innocent III, as well as works by Bonaventure and Bernhard von Clairvaux.

== Literature ==
In German

- P. Amelung: Heinrich Eggestein. In. Lexikon des gesamten Buchwesens (LGB). Publ. by Severin Corsten. 2nd new, completely revised and expanded edition. Vol. II. Hiersemann, Stuttgart 1989. p. 420-421. ISBN 3-7772-8911-6
- F. Geldner: Die deutschen Inkunabeldrucker. Ein Handbuch der deutschen Buchdrucker des XV. Jahrhunderts nach Druckorten. Teil 1. Das deutsche Sprachgebiet. Hiersemann, Stuttgart 1968. ISBN 3-7772-6825-9
- F. Geldner: Inkunabelkunde. Eine Einführung in die Welt des frühesten Buchdrucks. Reichert, Wiesbaden 1978. ISBN 3-920153-60-X
- E. Voulliéme: Die deutschen Drucker des fünfzehnten Jahrhunderts. Verlag der Reichdruckerei, Berlin 1922
