= Carl Friedrich Haase =

German obstetrician

Carl Friedrich Haase, name sometimes spelled as Karl Friedrich Haase (13 February 1788, Leipzig – 10 November 1865, Ober-Lössnitz near Dresden) was a German obstetrician.

In 1813 he obtained his medical doctorate from the University of Leipzig with the thesis Dissertatio de morbo coeruleao. In 1828 he was appointed professor of obstetrics and director of the maternity clinic at the medical-surgical academy in Dresden.

His name is associated with the "Haase rule", a formula for suggesting the age of a human fetus or newborn from its length (fetal length in centimeters correlates to the square of the age in months during the first 3 to 5 months of pregnancy, and to the fifth of the age in months during the second half of pregnancy). It is also referred to as "Haase's formula" (Haase-Formel).

With Johann Ludwig Choulant (1791–1861) and others, he was co-author of Bereicherungen für die Geburtshilfe, für die Physiologie und Pathologie des Weibes und Kindes (Enrichment for obstetrics, on the physiology and pathology of women and children). In 1846 with obstetrician Woldemar Ludwig Grenser (1812–1872), he successfully treated future writer Karl May (1842–1912) for visual impairment.
