= Hans von Gersdorff =

German surgeon

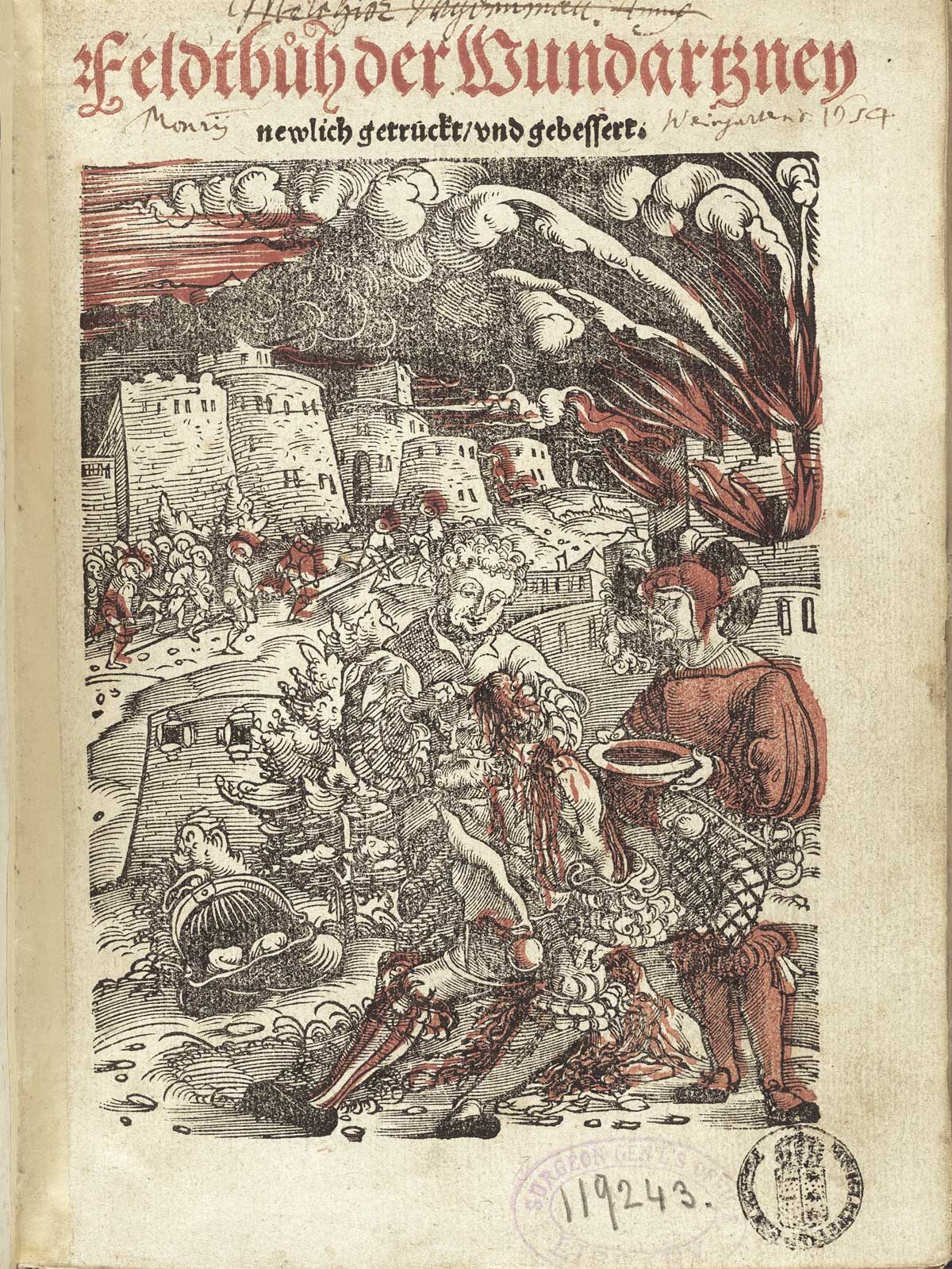
The title page of the Fieldbook

Hans von Gersdorff, also known as Schyl-Hans (approx. 1455 – 1529), was a German surgeon who published the Feldbuch der Wundarzney ("Field book of surgery") in 1517 (published by Johannes Schott in Strasbourg), with instructions for procedures such as amputation. It was illustrated with woodcuts attributed to Hans Wechtlin.

== Gallery ==
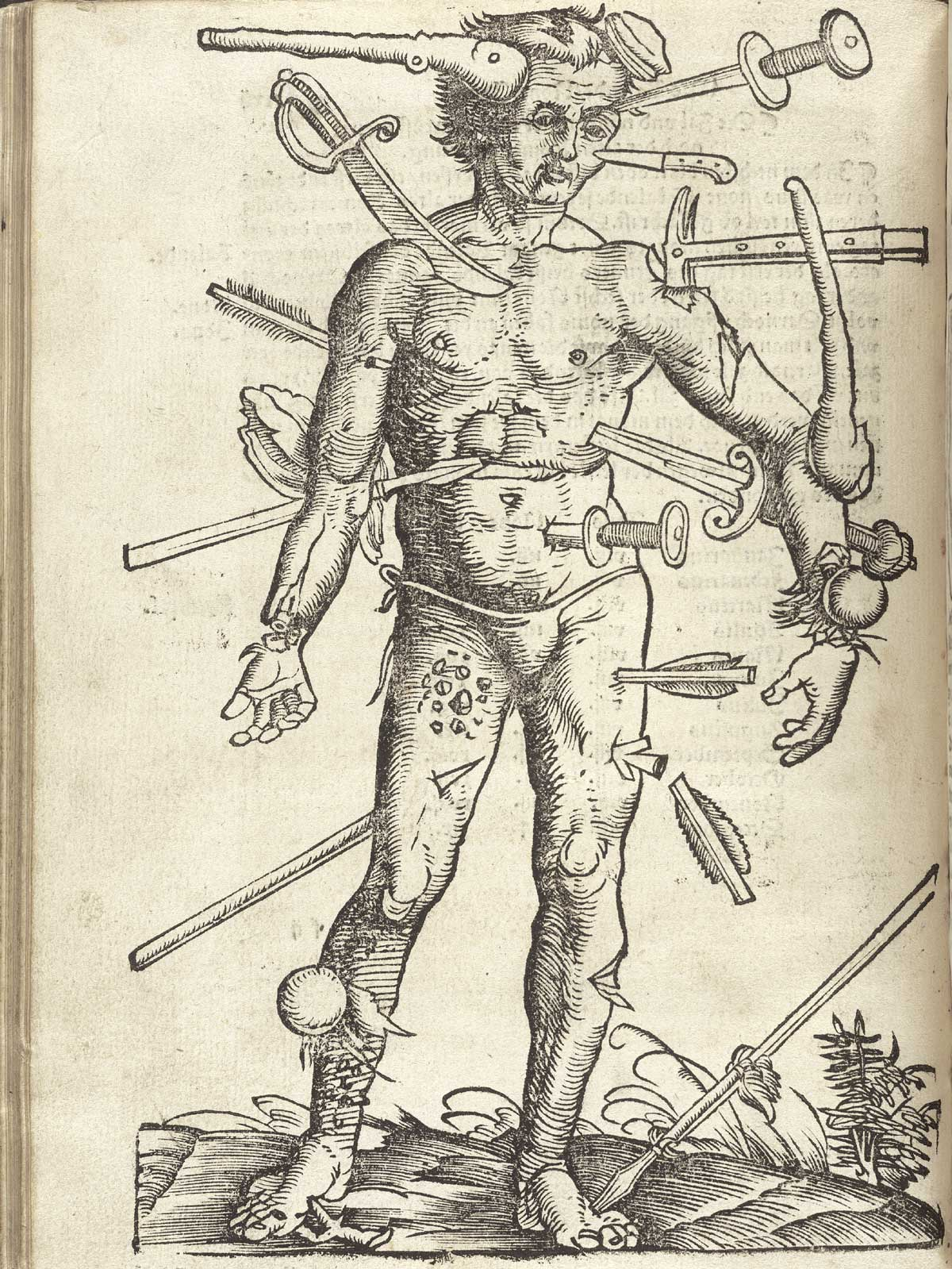
Der verwundete Mann (The wounded man) (page 21)

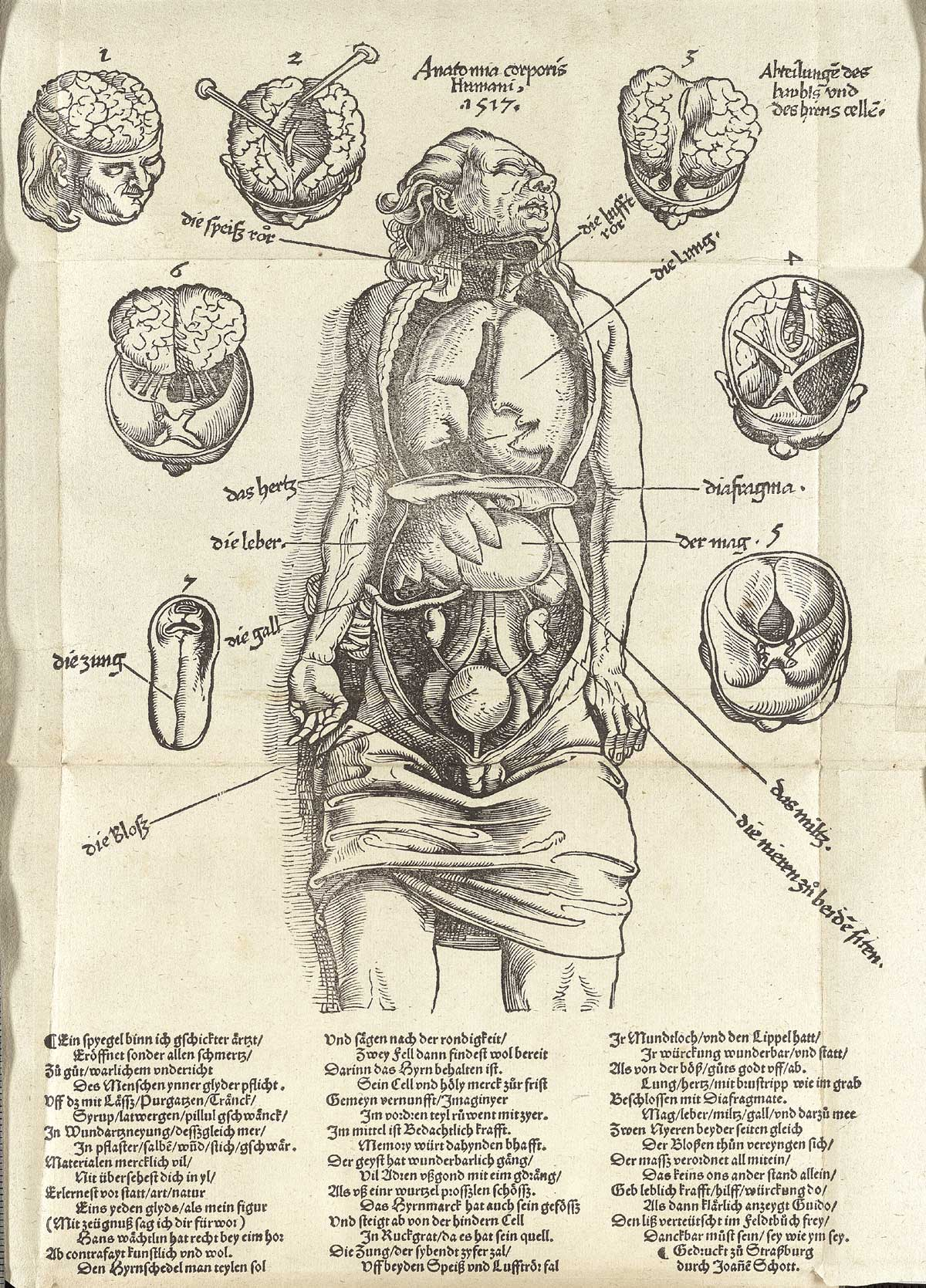
Die Eingeweide (The intestines)

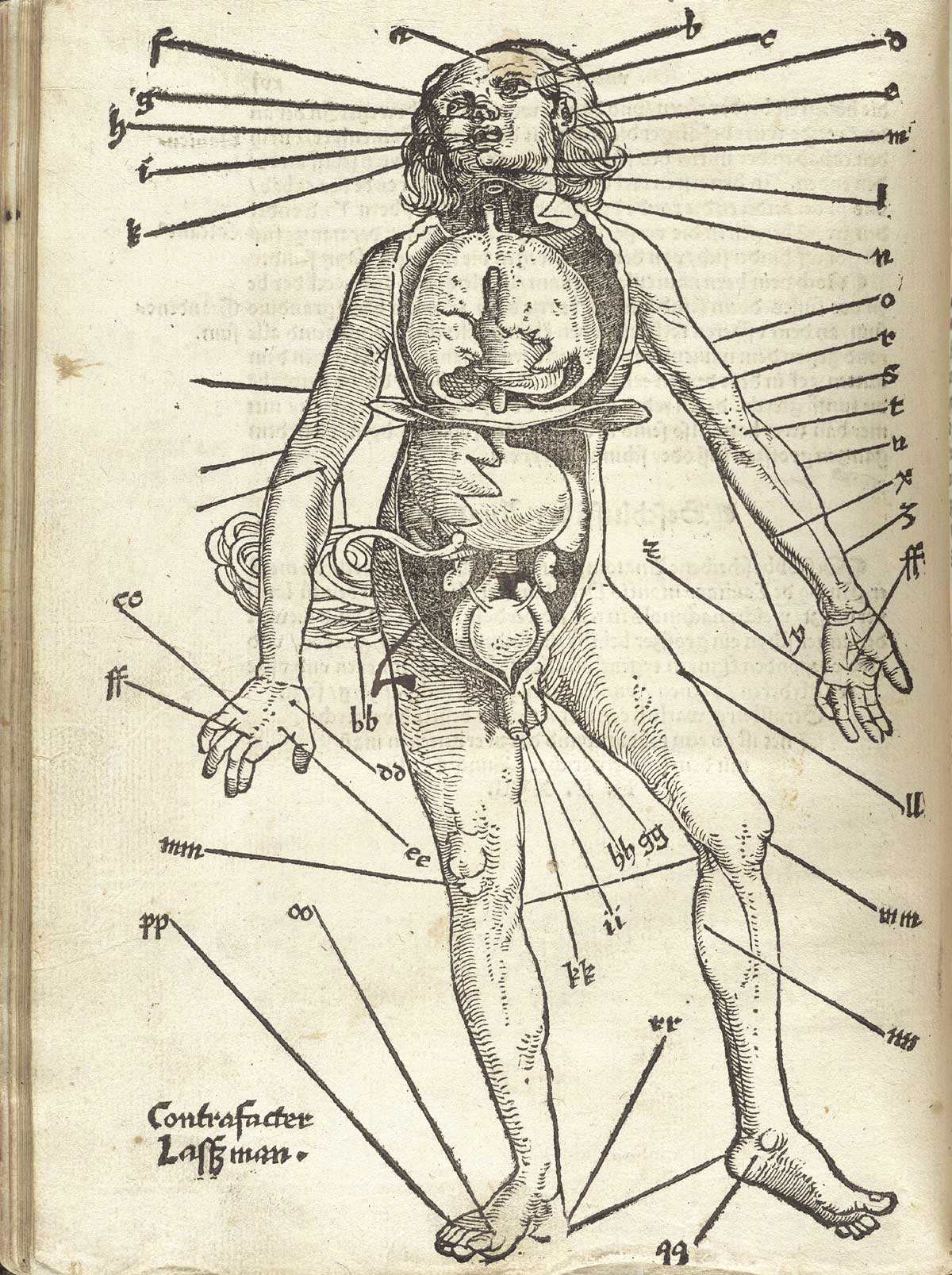
Aderlasspunkte. (Points for blood-letting) (page 16)

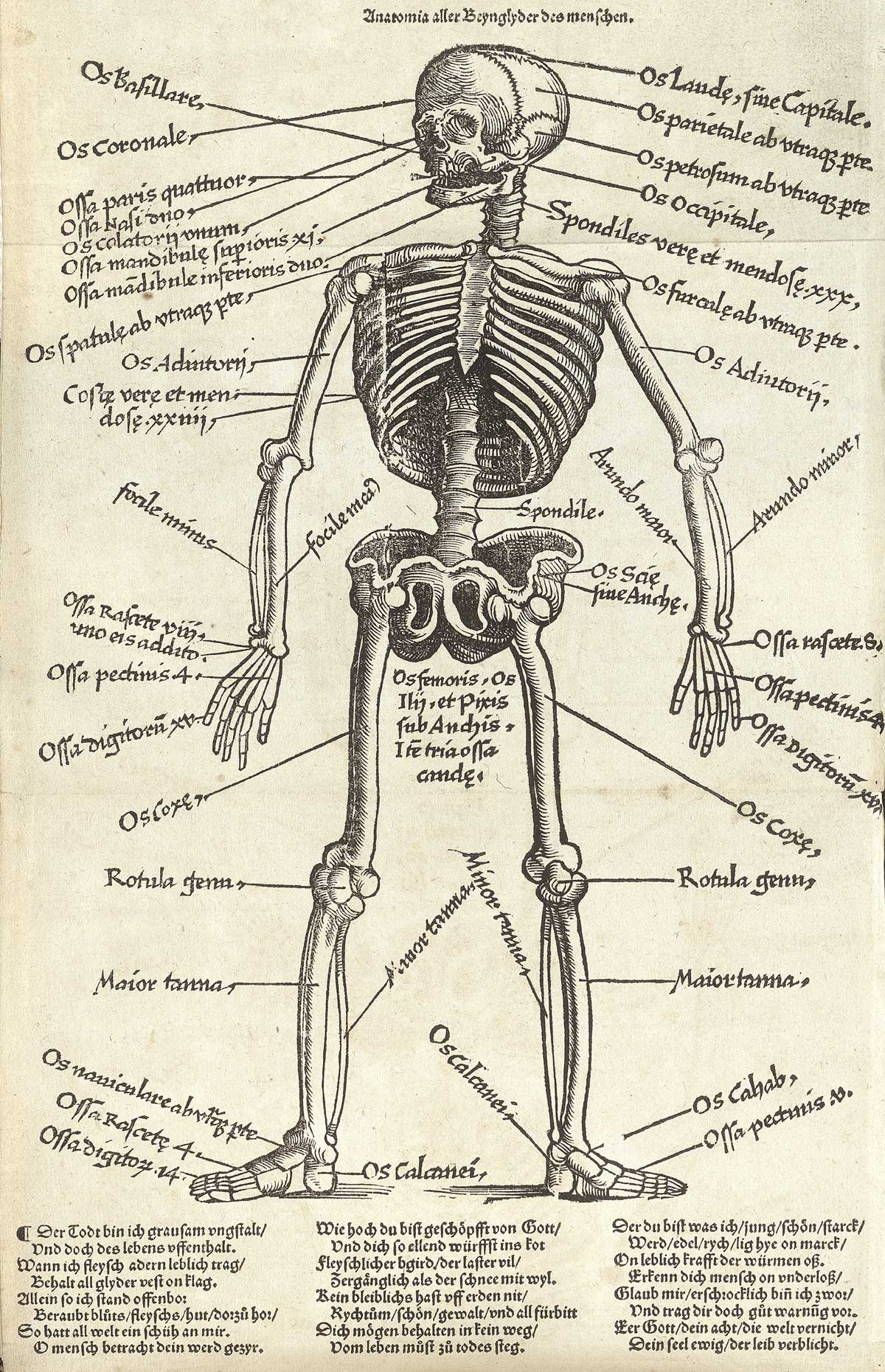
Die Knochenanatomie (Anatomy of the skeleton)

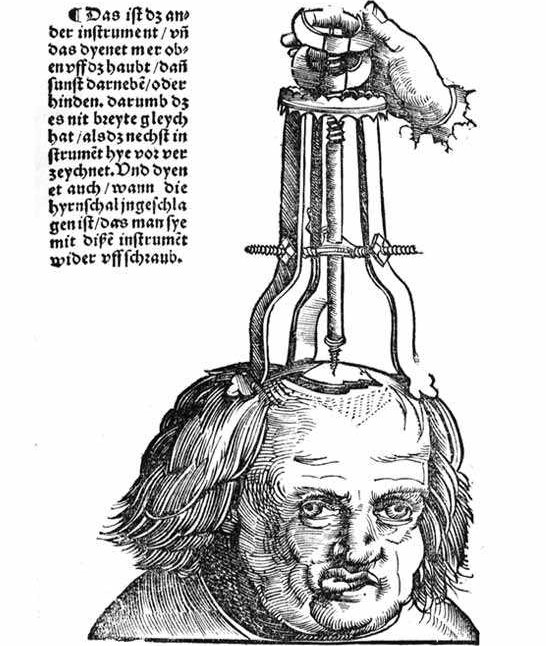
Behandlung einer Schädelwunde (Treatment of a skull injury)

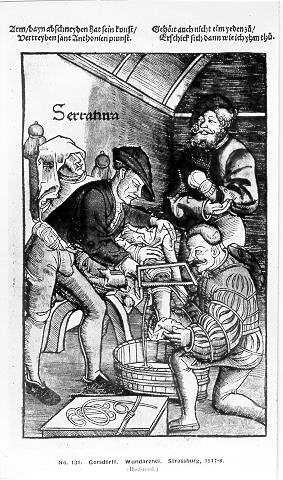
Amputation (Gersdorff (?))

== Literature ==
- Hans von Gersdorff: Feldbuch der Wundarznei. (Darmstadt: Wissenschaftliche Buchgesellschaft, 1967). Reprint of the 1517 edition.
- August Hirsch (1879). "Gersdorff, Hans" . Allgemeine Deutsche Biographie (in German). Vol. 9. Leipzig: Duncker & Humblot. p. 57.
- Ernest Wickersheimer (1964). "Gersdorff, Hans von". Neue Deutsche Biographie (in German). Vol. 6. Berlin: Duncker & Humblot. pp. 322–323.
- Johann Ludwig Choulant: History and bibliography of anatomic illustration. Trans. and annotated by Mortimer Frank. (New York: Hafner, 1962). S. 162-166.
- Morton's Medical Bibliography (Garrison and Morton). Ed. By Jeremy Norman. 5th ed. (Aldershot, Hants., England : Scolar Press; Brookfield, Vt., USA : Gower Pub. Co., 1991). No. 5560.
