= Lucidarius =

The Lucidarius, an anonymous medieval book, was the first German language summa, written circa 1190–1195. It was based on different sources, the chief one being the Elucidarium and other texts by Honorius Augustodunensis. Other sources include De philosophia mundi by William of Conches and De divinis officiis by Rupert of Deutz. It has been preserved in 66 partial or complete manuscripts, and 85 printings in German. It is claimed to be the first original German language work in prose.

It was an introduction for laymen to the current religious beliefs and general knowledge, and was divided into three books; within the first book a description of the Creation and of the world in three parts, Asia, Africa and Europe. The second book focused on Christianity and liturgy, with the third and final book centered on the afterlife and the Last Judgment.

The text has a prologue in verse, while the body is in prose, in the form of a dialogue between a student and his master. Different manuscripts of the text have different prose introductions, with one possibly slightly later version claiming that the text originated in Braunschweig under the impulse of Duke Henry the Lion.

The book continued to be reworked and expanded in later versions, with generally more emphasis on the general knowledge and less on the religious aspects. A printed version from Strassburg from around 1534 was specifically intended for Protestants and used information from Sebastian Franck's Weltbuch from 1534. Later printings, mainly from Frankfurt, followed this example, adding more illustrations and information. Parts from it were also used in Historia von D. Johann Fausten, the first Faust book.

Translations of the book appeared in Dutch, Danish, Croatian and Czech.

== Printed versions ==
The first known printed version of the book appeared in 1479 in Augsburg, by Anton Sorg. The same year another Augsburgian printer, Johann Bämler, also printed the book in a slightly different version, which was the source for most of the reprints of the next decades. The book continued to be reprinted in Augsburg, but further reprints appeared in the 1480s in Strassburg and from the 1490s on in Reutlingen, Speyer and Ulm.

- 1479: Augsburg, Anton Sorg (March, reprint 1480, 1482, 1483, 1486) and Johann Bämler (May)
- 1481: Strassburg, Martin Schott (reprint 1483 and 1485); Augsburg, Hermann Kästlin
- 1482: Strassburg, Heinrich Knoblochtzer and Johann Prüss; Augsburg, Johann Schönsperger (reprint 1484, 1488, 1491, 1494)
- 1485: Lübeck, Matthaeus Brandis
- 1488: Augsburg, Johann Schobsser
- 1491: Reutlingen, Michael Greyff
- 1493: Ulm, Johann Zainer
- 1494: Ulm, Conrad Dinckmut
- 1496: Ulm, Johann Zainer the Younger (reprint 1498)
- 1497: Speyer, Conrad Hist
- 1498: Pilsen, Mikuláš Bakalář (Czech version)
- 1499: Strassburg, Matthias Hupfuff (reprint 1506, 1511 and 1514)
- 1503: Bartholomäus Kistler
