= Woldemar Ludwig Grenser =

German obstetrician (1812-1872)

- Born: January 2, 1812; Dresden-Neustadt
- Died: June 2, 1872 (aged 60); Dresden
- Education: University of Leipzig

Woldemar Ludwig Grenser (born January 2, 1812, in Dresden, died June, 2 1872 in Dresden) was a German obstetrician.

In 1830, he started studying medicine at the University of Leipzig, obtaining his doctorate in 1838; with a dissertation titled De vi puerperii lactandique temporis medication trice. In 1839, Grenser took a scientific journey, visiting Prague, Vienna, Paris, London, Würzburg and Heidelberg. In 1843, he became an associate professor of obstetrics at the University of Leipzig, and two years later relocated to Dresden as professor of obstetrics at the medical-surgical academy and director of the maternity institute.

In 1856 he was appointed Königlich Sächsischen Hofrat (Royal Saxon Court Councilor), and in 1864 became Geheimen Medizinalrat (Privy Medical Councilor).

Among his written works was an edition of Friedrich August von Ammon's Die ersten Mutterpflichten und die erste Kindespflege (1864), and with Hermann Franz Naegele (1801–1851), was co-author of Traité pratique de l'art des accouchements. He also posthumously continued work on Naegele's Lehrbuch der Geburtshilfe (Textbook of Obstetrics). Other noted works by Grenser include:

- Über Aether-Einathmungen während der Geburt, Leipzig 1847 – On ether inhalation during birth.
- Lehrbuch der Hebammenkunst, Leipzig 1863 – Textbook on midwifery.

In 1846 with Carl Friedrich Haase (1788-1865), he successfully treated future writer Karl May (1842-1912) for visual impairment.
