= Johannes Indagine =

Johannes Indagine, also Johannes ab Indagine, also Johannes von Hagen (1467-1537), was a German humanist and priest from Steinheim (Hanau) in Hessen. He worked with Albert of Brandenburg and accompanied him to Rome in 1514, when Brandenburg was Elector and Archbishop of Mainz, and became his advisor. He used the Latinized name "ab Indagine" for his publications.

His Introductiones apotelematiscae was published in Strasbourg in 1522 by Johannes Schott, who also published a German translation, the next year, Die Kunst der chiromanzey
