= Mortimer Frank =

American ophthalmologist and translator (1874–1919)

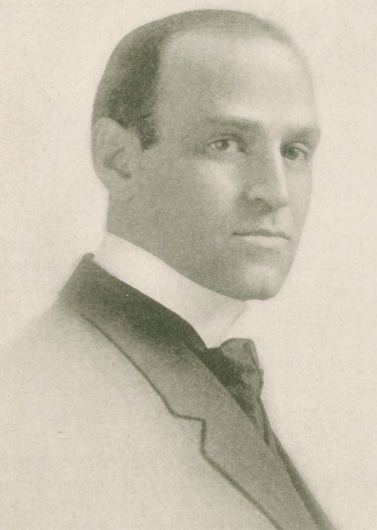

Mortimer Frank (May 26, 1874 – April 21, 1919) was an American ophthalmologist who took a special interest in the history of medicine. His most famous work was a translation of the work of Johann Ludwig Choulant which was published posthumously.

== Life and work ==
Frank was born in Buffalo, New York on May 26, 1874, but grew up in Chicago. He graduated as an engineer from the Massachusetts Institute of Technology in 1897 and worked as a railroads civil engineer for two years before joining the University of Illinois to study medicine and graduated in 1901. He trained in ophthalmology. He worked at the Michael Reese hospital in Chicago.

He married Donie Katz on October 4, 1905, and they had two children.

Also in 1905, he began to examine the history of ophthalmology with a paper on the charlatan eye surgeons "John Taylor and Sir William Read", and in 1915 he became secretary of the Chicago Society of Medical History, editing its journal. He began to collect old and historic medical works. At his own expense he produced a reprint of Henry Morley's Anatomy in Long Clothes in 1915. After his death, his collection of 522 books on anatomy was donated to the Special collections of the John Crerar Library at the University of Chicago. His translation of the work of Johann Ludwig Choulant led to his being made a member of the German Medical History Society in 1916. Unfortunately his work was not published when he died of a cerebral haemorrhage. The translation was to be published by his colleague Fielding H. Garrison, but he did not.

Mortimer Frank died in Chicago on April 21, 1919, and was buried at Rosehill Cemetery.
