= Adolf Rusch =

German printer and publisher

Adolf Rusch von Ingweiler (ca. 1435 – 26 May 1489 in Straßburg) was a notable German printer and publisher. He was the first printer north of the Alps to print in Antiqua.

== Life and work ==
Rusch was probably born at Ingweiler in Alsace. Before 1488 he married Salome Mentelin, a daughter of the well-known Straßburg printer Johannes Mentelin, in whose printing shop he assisted. He used to cooperate with Johann Amerbach, a printer from Basel, from which he used some sets of types in 1481. In the Rationale divinorum officium, printed by Rusch in or before 1474, he was the first to use the Antiqua type which had originated in Italy; in this type Rusch issued Latin classics, including works by Plutarch and Seneca. Jointly with Mentelin he produced theological and medical works, in the Mentelin typeface. Rusch left behind an extensive correspondence.

In the 19th century his work had not yet been attributed to him and was ascribed to the R-printer because of the peculiar shape of the capital 'R' used by him.
