= Johannes Mentelin =

German printer (Alsatian)

- Born: Schlettstadt (today Sélestat, Grand Est)

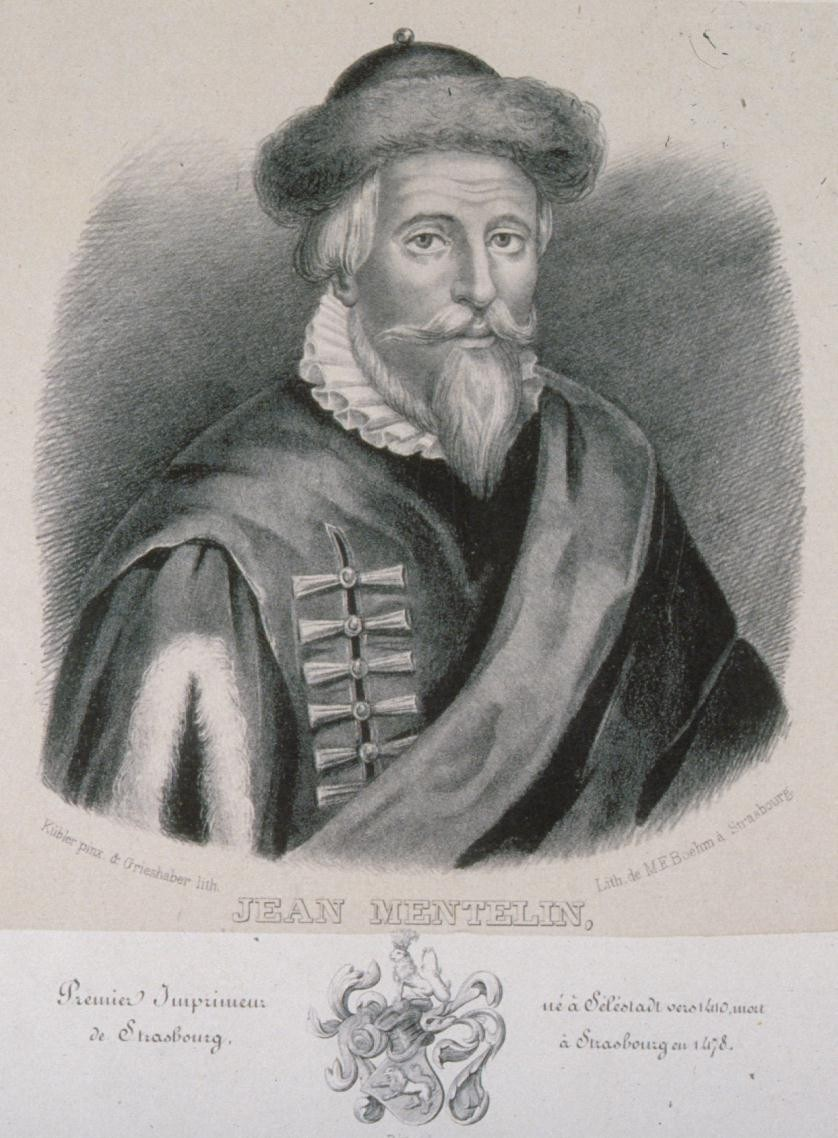
Lithograph of Johannes Mentelin

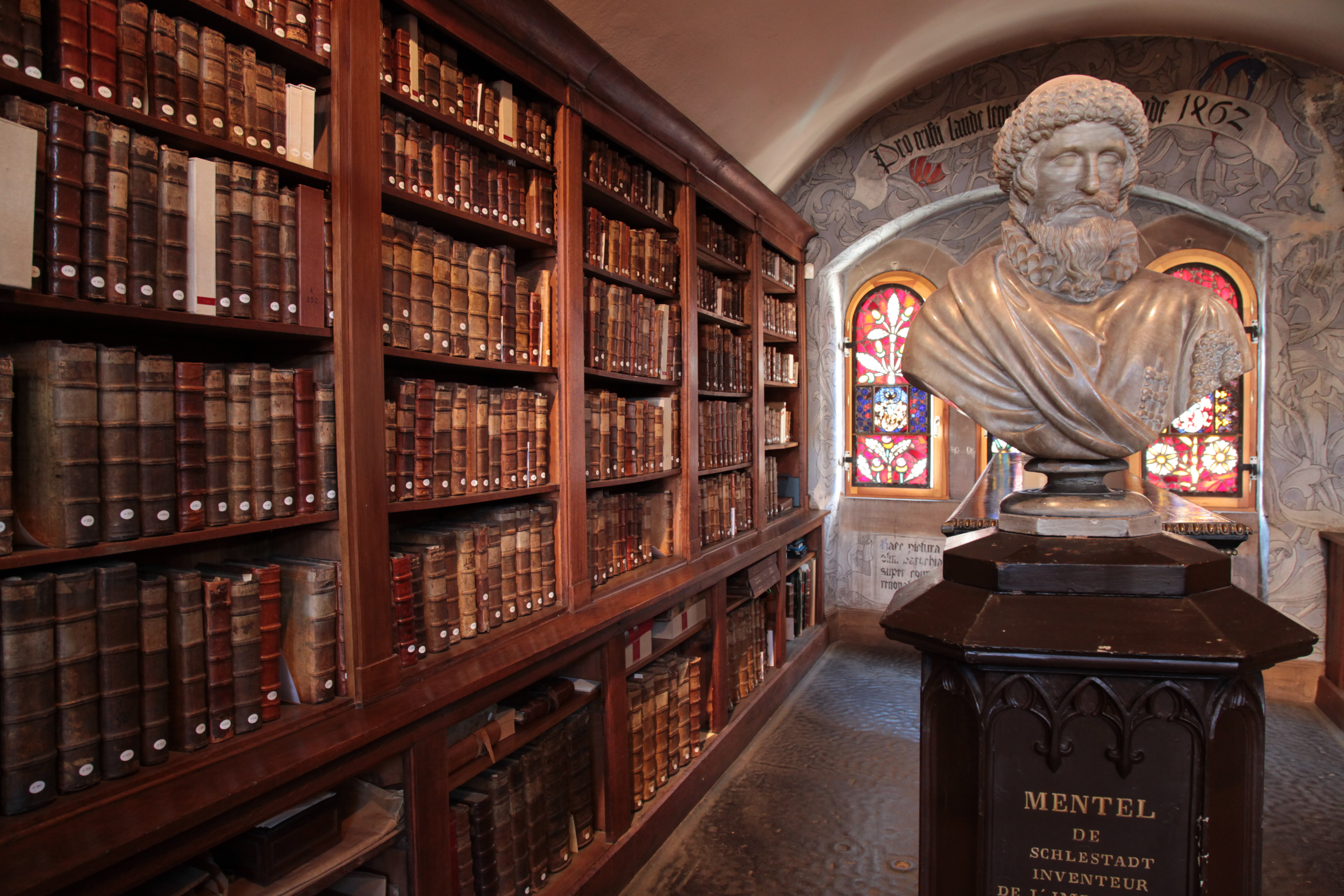
Bust of Mentelin inside the Humanist Library of Sélestat

Johannes Mentelin, sometimes also spelled Mentlin, (born around 1410 in Schlettstadt, today Sélestat; died December 12, 1478, in Strasbourg) was a pioneering German book printer and bookseller. In 1466 he printed and published the first German language Bible.

== Career ==
Mentelin came from Selestadt and in 1447, Johannes Mentelin gained the rights of a Strasbourg citizen. He was first a Goldschreiber (calligrapher and book scribe) by profession and worked in addition as an episcopal notary.

At the end of the 1450s Mentelin founded his Strasbourg printery. At the time there was still no other place where printing was done besides Mainz. It is likely, that Mentelin either got his knowledge directly there or through a middleman. Such a go-between might have been Heinrich Eggestein. It is suspected that he had been introduced to the trade of book printing during his stay in Mainz from Johannes Gutenberg. He did not set up his own Offizin (an old German term for a book printing company) until the middle of the 1460s. Due to a lack of sources, the final clarification of this question must unfortunately remain unanswered for now. From the available data, it can however be concluded that Mentelin was the first book printer active in Strasbourg and thus one of the first anywhere in Europe, even before Heinrich Eggestein.

The first printing which carries Mentelin's name is Augustine's Tractatus de arte praedicandi from the year 1465. However, it is assumed that Mentelin had already begun to print significantly earlier, probably even already in 1458. His oldest known printed work is a Latin Bible printed with 49 lines per page ("B49"), whose first volume is dated 1460. As Gutenberg's Bible was printed with 42 lines per page, Mentelin's had fewer pages and proved handier.

Mentelin quickly achieved business success, which made him a prosperous man. In 1466, he was even awarded a coat of arms by Emperor Frederick III. After about 20 years as a book printer, Mentelin died on December 12, 1478, in Strasbourg. He was buried in the cemetery of the (no longer existing) St.-Michael's-Chapel. His grave was later removed and is now inside Strasbourg Cathedral. One of daughters married the book printer Martin Schott, and another married Adolf Rusch.

== Printed works ==
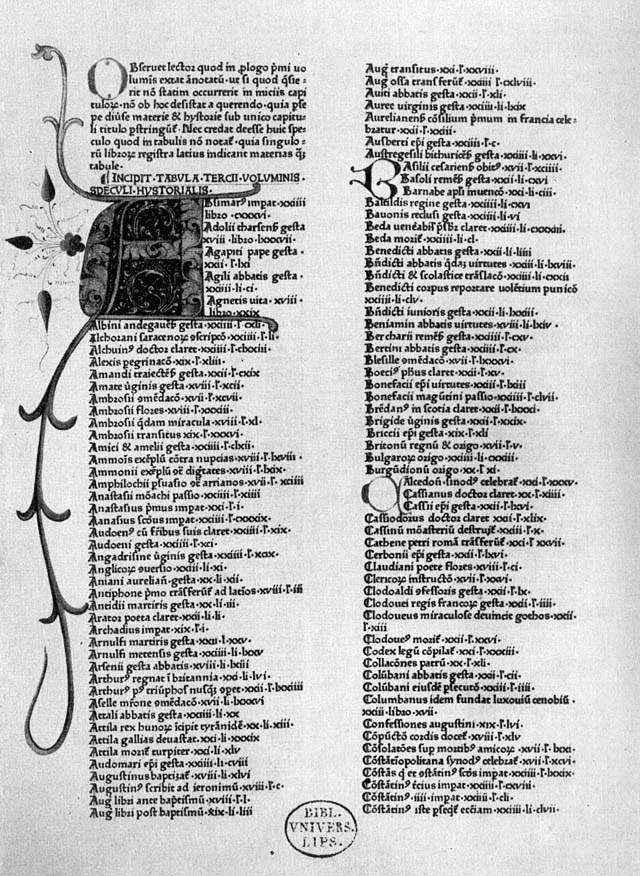
Vincentius Bellovacensis „Speculum maius“ Straßburg 1473 Teil 3 "Speculum historiale"

In 1466 he printed and published the first German language Bible. However, about 40 printed works are ascribed to Mentelin's Strasbourg Offizin. His printing and publishing list contained predominantly theological and philosophical works in Latin, whose purity of text was ensured by scholarly proofreaders. Among others, works of Augustine, Thomas Aquinas, Aristotle, John Chrysostom, Isidore of Seville and Albertus Magnus were issued. In 1472 he published the Postilla super totam Bibliam, Nicolaus de Lyra's commentary of the Bible. Mentelin also published texts of classical antiquity (such as Virgil's Opera and the Comoediae of Terence). As the only German book printer, Mentelin printed Medieval court literature, such as Wolfram von Eschenbach's Parzival and Der jüngere Titurel ("The Younger Titurel") of Albrecht von Scharfenberg.

== Literature ==
- Geldner, F (1968), Die deutschen Inkunabeldrucker. Ein Handbuch der deutschen Buchdrucker des XV. Jahrhunderts nach Druckorten (in German), vol. 1. Das deutsche Sprachgebiet, Stuttgart: Hiersemann, ISBN 3-7772-6825-9.
- Harthausen, H (1989), "Johannes Mentelin", in Corsten, Severin (ed.), Lexikon des gesamten Buchwesens (LGB) (in German), vol. V (2nd new, completely revised and expanded ed.), Stuttgart: Hiersemann, p. 145, ISBN 3-7772-9904-9.
- Schorbach, Karl (1932), Der Straßburger Frühdrucker Johann Mentelin (1458-1478): Studien zu seinem Leben und Werke (in German), Mainz.
- Voulliéme, E (1922), Die deutschen Drucker des fünfzehnten Jahrhunderts (in German) (2nd ed.), Berlin: Reichdruckerei.
