= Hans Wechtlin =

German Renaissance artist

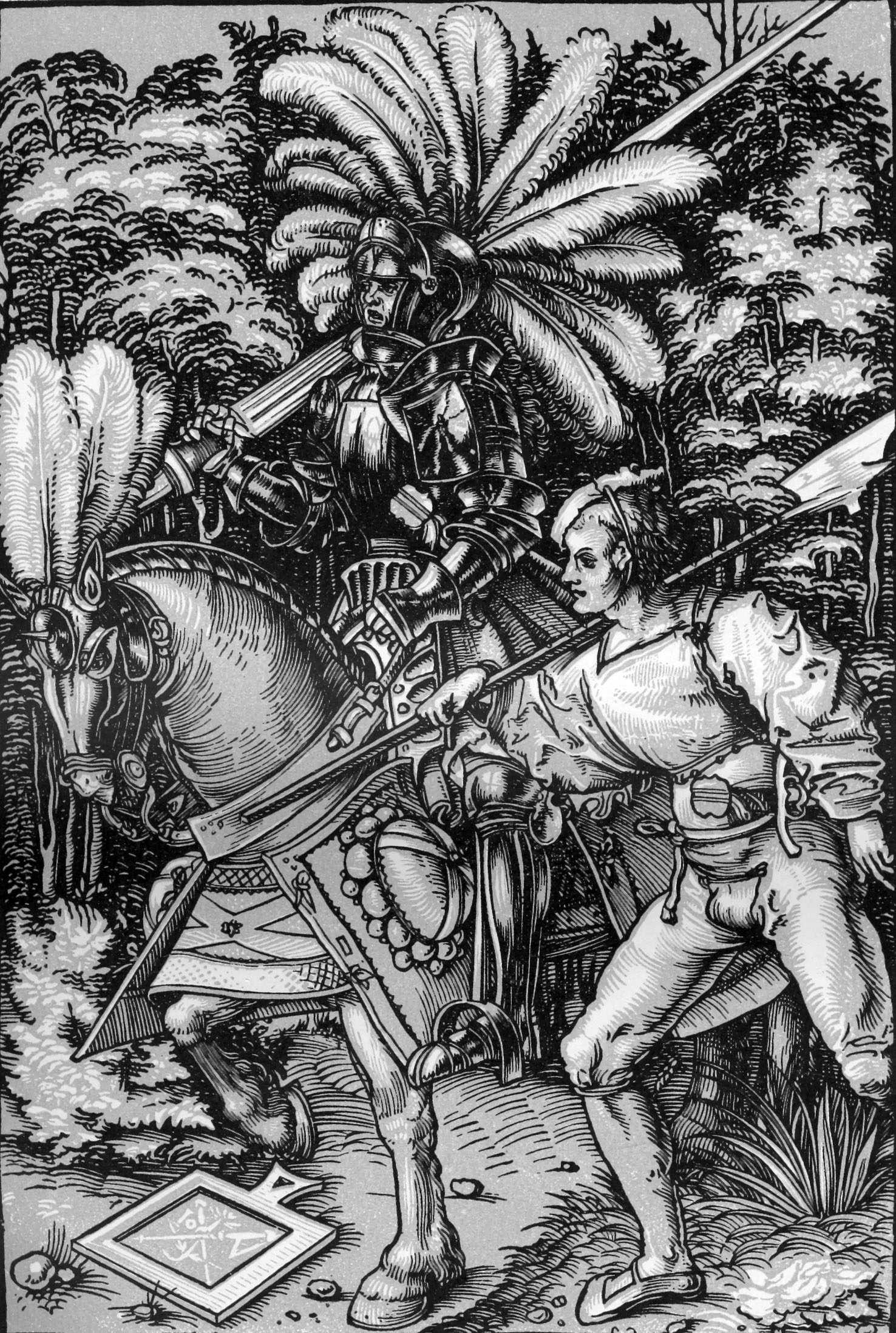
Wechtlin's woodcut Knight and Halberdier, reproduced in black-and-white. 26.8 x 18 cm.

Johann, Johannes or Hans Wechtlin was a German Renaissance artist, active between at least 1502 and 1526, whose woodcuts are his only certainly surviving work. He was the most prolific producer of German chiaroscuro woodcuts, printed in two or more colours, during their period in fashion, though most of his output was of book illustrations.

== Life ==
He was born in about 1480-85, presumably in Strasbourg, then in Germany and now in France, where his father, also called Hans Wechtlin, was a cloth merchant. Most of his identified works are woodcut book illustrations, the first, scenes from the Life of Christ, are from a Strasbourg book of 1502, and the last is a Strasbourg title-page of 1526. In 1505 he began a year of employment as a painter to René II, Duke of Lorraine in Nancy. After he left Nancy he was in Wittenberg in 1506-7, where he must have met the court painter, Lucas Cranach the Elder. He became a citizen of Strasbourg in 1514, and by 1519 was a master of the painter's guild there.

== Single woodcuts ==
He left nineteen single-leaf wood-cuts (i.e. prints rather than book illustrations), apparently made in the period 1505-15, and is mainly remembered for his twelve chiaroscuro woodcuts, which are all extremely rare. The dating of these has been much discussed by art-historians, as part of the very tangled issue of the development of the German chiaroscuro woodcut. Bartrum assigns them "towards the end" of the 16th century. No surviving paintings are attributed to him, although a few drawings have been, tentatively. As with most artists in woodcut, art historians now consider that Wechtlin probably just designed the woodcuts, leaving the block-cutting to a specialist "formschneider" who pasted the design to the wood and chiselled the white areas away. The quality of the final woodcuts, which varies considerably, depended on the skill of the cutter as well as the artist.

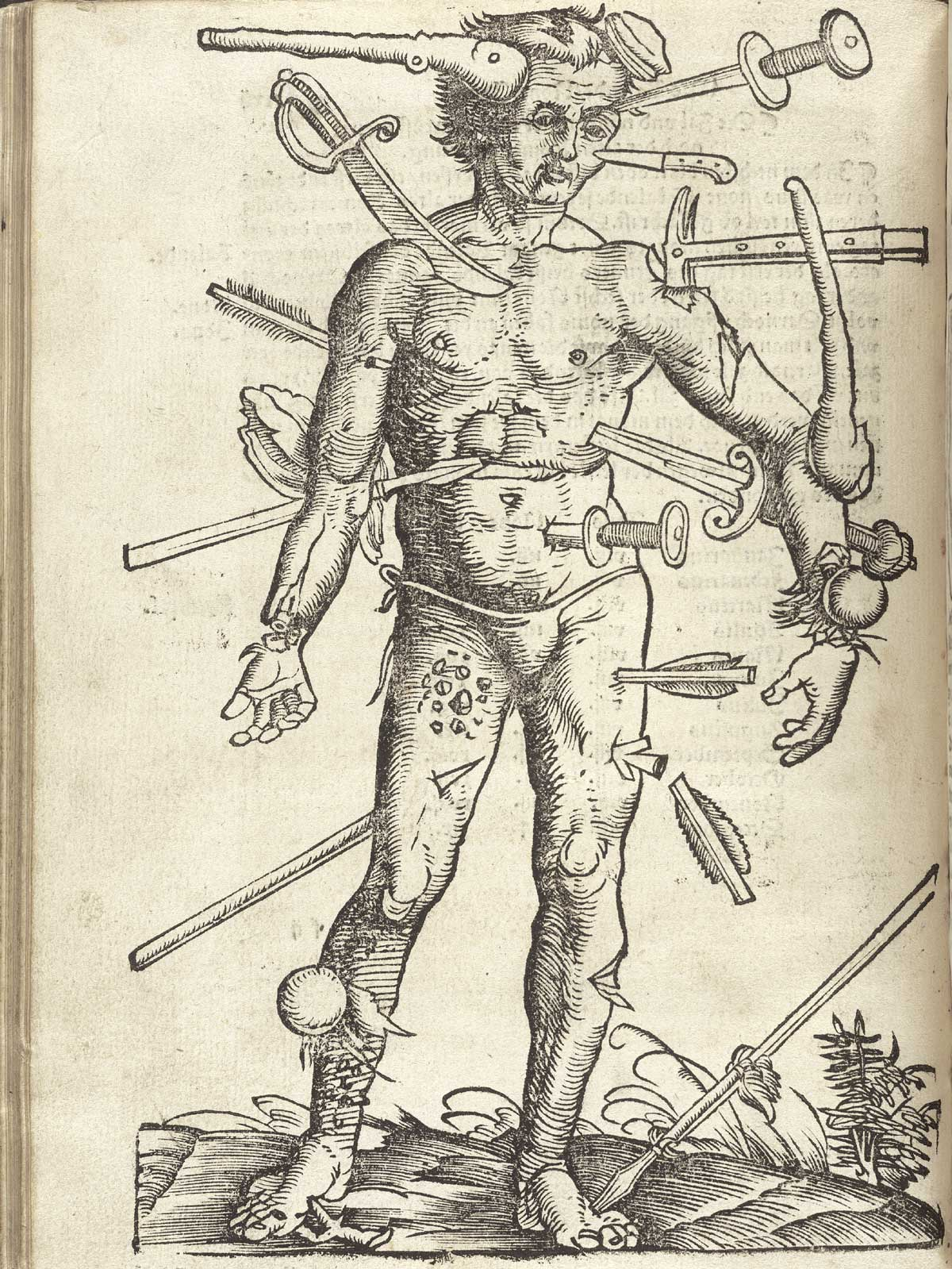
An illustration for Feldtbuch der Wundartzney (1517, 1st edn.), a manual for the military surgeon

His best known print is the chiaroscuro Skull Within an Ornamental Frame, "by far his most impressive" and "one of the most powerful [images] of the German Renaissance", which is the only one for which there is evidence of dating, as it is copied in a book of 1512. Four of his chiaroscuro prints are somewhat ostentatiously classical, two on the very obscure subjects of Alcon Slaying the Serpent and Pyrgoteles (a famous Ancient Greek gem-carver), as well the better known ones of Pyramus and Thisbe and Orpheus. They show Italianate influence, especially from the engravings of Marcantonio Raimondi, from whom the figures of Pyramus and Thisbe are directly borrowed. His woodcut technique is based on that of Albrecht Dürer, though his wooded backgrounds owe more to Cranach.

His Knight and Halberdier (illustrated above) is in the chivalrous spirit influenced by Emperor Maximilian and his calls for a crusade; indeed the style of armour the knight wears is often called "Maximilian armour". Other early chiaroscuro woodcuts were equestrian portraits of similar knightly figures, a portrait of Maximilian by Hans Burgkmair, and versions of Saint George and the Dragon looking very similar to the Emperor, by both Cranach and Burgkmair. Wechtlin's twelve prints were the largest individual contribution to the corpus of about sixty German chiaroscuro woodcuts from the early 16th century - the technique was probably invented by Burgkmair in 1508. Unlike Burgkmair's often frankly garish colours, Wechtlin's colour woodcuts use only two blocks and muted colours. In both the Cleveland and Cincinnati impressions of the Knight and Halberdier there are black line blocks and a "greyish-blue" tone block; other tone blocks are described as "blue-grey" (Orpheus and the Skull) and "grey-green" (Pyramus and Thisbe).

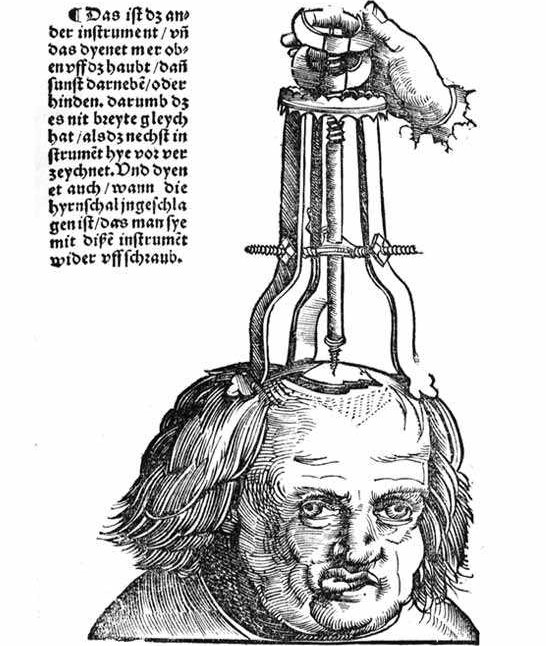
Another illustration to the Feldtbuch der Wundartzney

His monogram, used only on eleven of his chiaroscuro prints, consists in its fullest form of his initials "Io V" between two diagonally crossed pilgrim's staves, with a flower in the centre, on a cartellino or plaque, a style copied from Albrecht Dürer. His prints, recognised as a group, remained unattributed to any documented artist until 1851, when his name on the title page of a book he illustrated was connected with the monogram and the few documentary records. A similar monogram was used by the glass-painter Jacob Wechtlin, perhaps a brother.

== Book illustrations ==
His best known book illustrations in his own time were 135 woodcuts from Sebastian Brant's 1502 edition of Virgil's Aeneid, "perhaps the most influential book illustrations ever produced in Europe", though the attribution to him is not universally agreed. This was the first printed Virgil with illustrations. These crowded compositions retain many Gothic features, compared for example with Botticelli's rather earlier painted illustrations to Dante. They were copied in many other book editions and about thirty years later in a famous series of Limoges enamel plaques by the "Master of the Aeneid Series", one of many such derivative works.

Better-known today are the often rather gruesome woodcuts for Hans von Gersdorff's (1455–1529) Feldtbuch der Wundartzney (literally "Field-book of the Wound-medicine", 1517, 1st edn.), a manual for the military surgeon (see Commons). These have sometimes been coloured by hand, but are printed in black and white. His frontispiece for the 1526 edition, produced when he was probably in his forties, is the last known trace of him. He is not to be confused with Hans Weiditz, another Strasbourg woodcut artist of the period.
