= Johann Ludwig Choulant =

German physician and medical historian

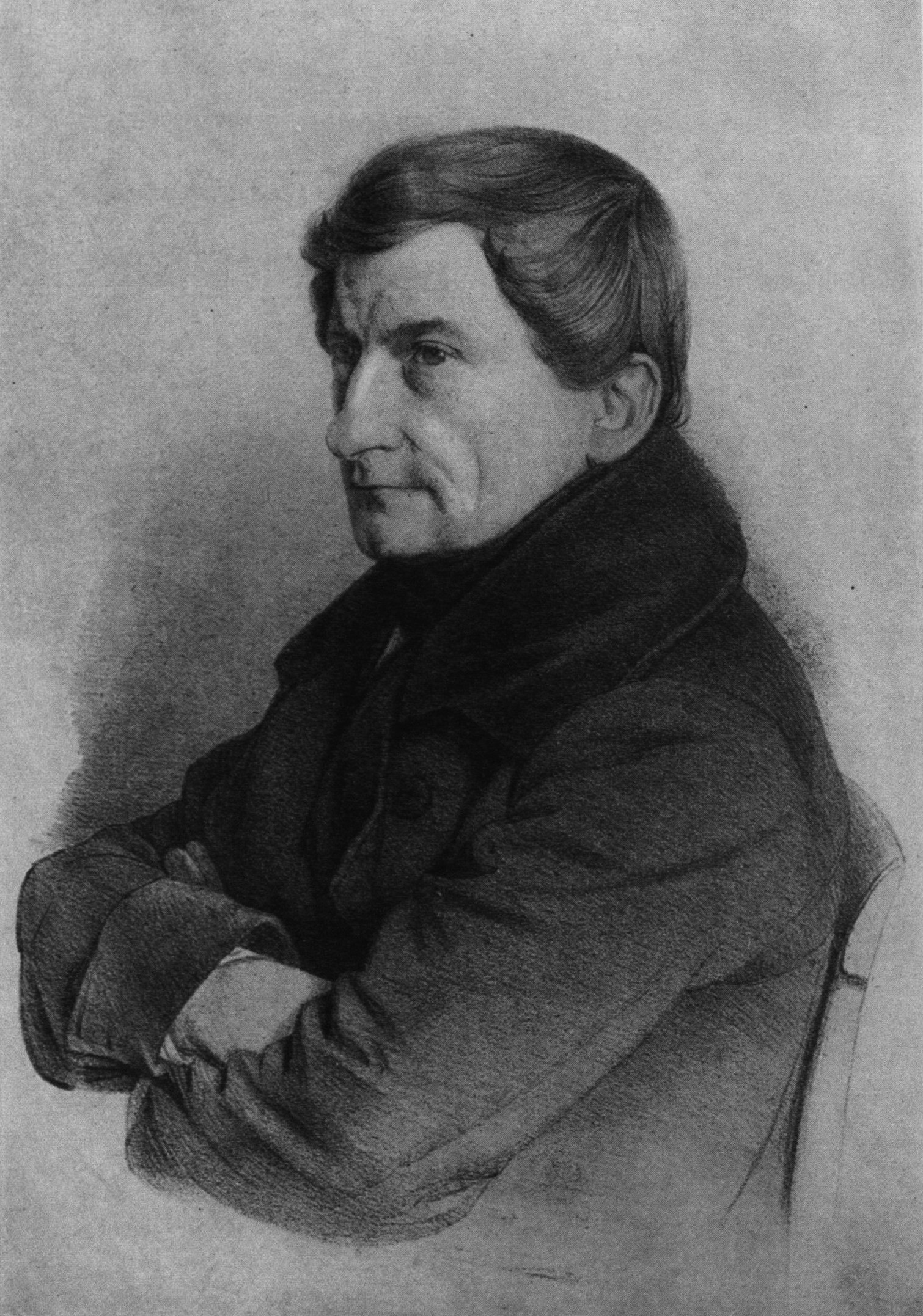
Johann Ludwig Choulant (1791-1861)

Johann Ludwig Choulant (12 November 1791 – 18 July 1861) was a German medical doctor from the Kingdom of Saxony who was a professor of Medicine at Dresden medical historian and contributed to the study of the history of medicine. He was the father of architect Ludwig Theodor Choulant (1827–1900). He trained initially in pharmacy before shifting to medicine. A student of classical languages, he examined old works on medicine and produced an influential history of medical illustration which was translated into English by Mortimer Frank and others in 1920.

== Life and work ==
Choulant was born in Dresden, the son of a master cook in the service of Antony of Saxony. He studied at the Catholic school in Dresden and then to the Gymnasium. In 1807 he dropped studies and went to apprentice at the Royal Pharmacy. In 1811 he went to study medicine at the Collegium Medico-chirurgicum in Dresden where he studied under Hedenus, Kreysig and Ohle. In 1813 he went to the University of Leipzig, where he was influenced by studies under Ernst Platner. This was followed by work in 1817 as a physician/obstetrician in Altenburg. He graduated with a dissertation on spinal deformities in March 1818. During the same year he joined the staff at the Medizinischen Realwörterbuch of Johann Friedrich Pierer (1767–1832). In 1821 he was a physician at the Königlichen Katholischen Krankenstift in Dresden-Friedrichstadt.

In 1822 he began work as a lecturer at the Königlich Chirurgisch-Medizinische Akademie (Royal Surgical-Medical Academy) in Dresden, where during the following year he became a professor of theoretical medicine. In 1828 he became a professor of practical medicine, and from 1843 to 1860 was rector of the Royal Surgical-Medical Academy. From 1844 onward, he served as medical officer in the Saxon Ministry of the Interior and served a privy councilor to the king.

Trained in Latin and Greek, he translated material from English and Italian into German. He produced a bibliography of ancient medicine. In addition to his work involving the history of medicine, Choulant made many contributions to the Saxon Medizinalordnung (medical code). His textbook on internal medicine went through six editions. In 1823 he began work as an associate editor of the journal Zeitschrift für Natur- und Heilkunde. A major work was on the history of anatomical illustration which he published in 1852. It was translated into English by Mortimer Frank and others in 1920. He suffered from cerebrovascular attacks, first in 1858 which led to facial paralysis. He had a second stroke which paralyzed his tongue. His health declined and he died in 1861. His autopsy was conducted by Friedrich Albert von Zenker.

== Published works ==
- Bereicherungen für die Geburtshilfe, für die Physiologie und Pathologie des Weibes und Kindes. with Friedrich Ludwig Meissner (1796-1860), M. Küstner and Karl Friedrich Haase (1788-1865), (Enrichment for obstetrics, on the physiology and pathology of women and children); 1821.
- Tafeln zur Geschichte der Medizin (Tables on the history of medicine); 1822.
- Lehrbuch der speziellen Pathologie und Therapie des Menschen (Textbook on special pathology and therapy of man); 1831.
- An edition of De Viribus Herbarum; 1832.
- Anleitung zur ärztlichen Rezeptierkunst (Manual for medical dispensing); second edition 1834.
- Anleitung zur ärztlichen Praxi (Guide to the medical practice); 1836.
- Handbuch der Bücherkunde für die ältere Medizin; second edition 1841.
- Bibliotheca medico-historica; 1841.
- Geschichte und Bibliographie der anatomischen Abbildung (History and bibliography of anatomic illustration); 1852.
- Die Anfänge wissenschaftlicher Naturgeschichte und naturhistorischer Abbildung im Abendland (The beginnings of scientific natural history and natural history illustration in the West); 1857.
- Graphische Inkunabeln für Naturgeschichte und Medizin (Graphical incunabula for natural history and medicine); 1858.
