= Saint Silvia =

Italian Roman Catholic saint

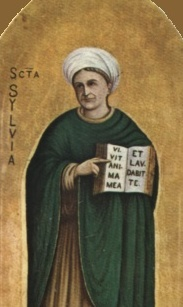
- Saint Silvia by an altar painter; her eyes are erroneously depicted as dark instead of blue.
- Born: c. 515 AD; Rome or Sicily
- Died: c. 592 AD
- Venerated in: Roman Catholic Church; Eastern Orthodox Church
- Feast: 3 November
- Patronage: Invoked by pregnant women for a safe delivery

Silvia, or Sylvia, (c. 515 – c. 592) was the mother of Gregory the Great. She is venerated as a saint by the Catholic Church and Eastern Orthodox Church, which names her a patroness of pregnant women.

== Life ==
Little biographical information about her exists. Her native place is sometimes given as Sicily, sometimes as Rome. Apparently, she was of a distinguished family as her husband, the Roman regionarius, Gordianus, of the gens Anicia. She had, besides Gregory, a second son, whose name did not survive through the ages. Their house was on the Clivus Scauri.

Silvia was noted for her great piety, and she gave her sons an excellent education. After the death of her husband, around 573, she devoted herself to religion in the "new cell by the gate of blessed Paul" (cella nova juxta portam beati Pauli). She continued to provide Gregory's monastic house with vegetables from her garden. Gregory the Great had a mosaic portrait of his parents executed at the monastery of Saint Andrew; it is minutely described by Johannes Diaconus.

== Veneration ==
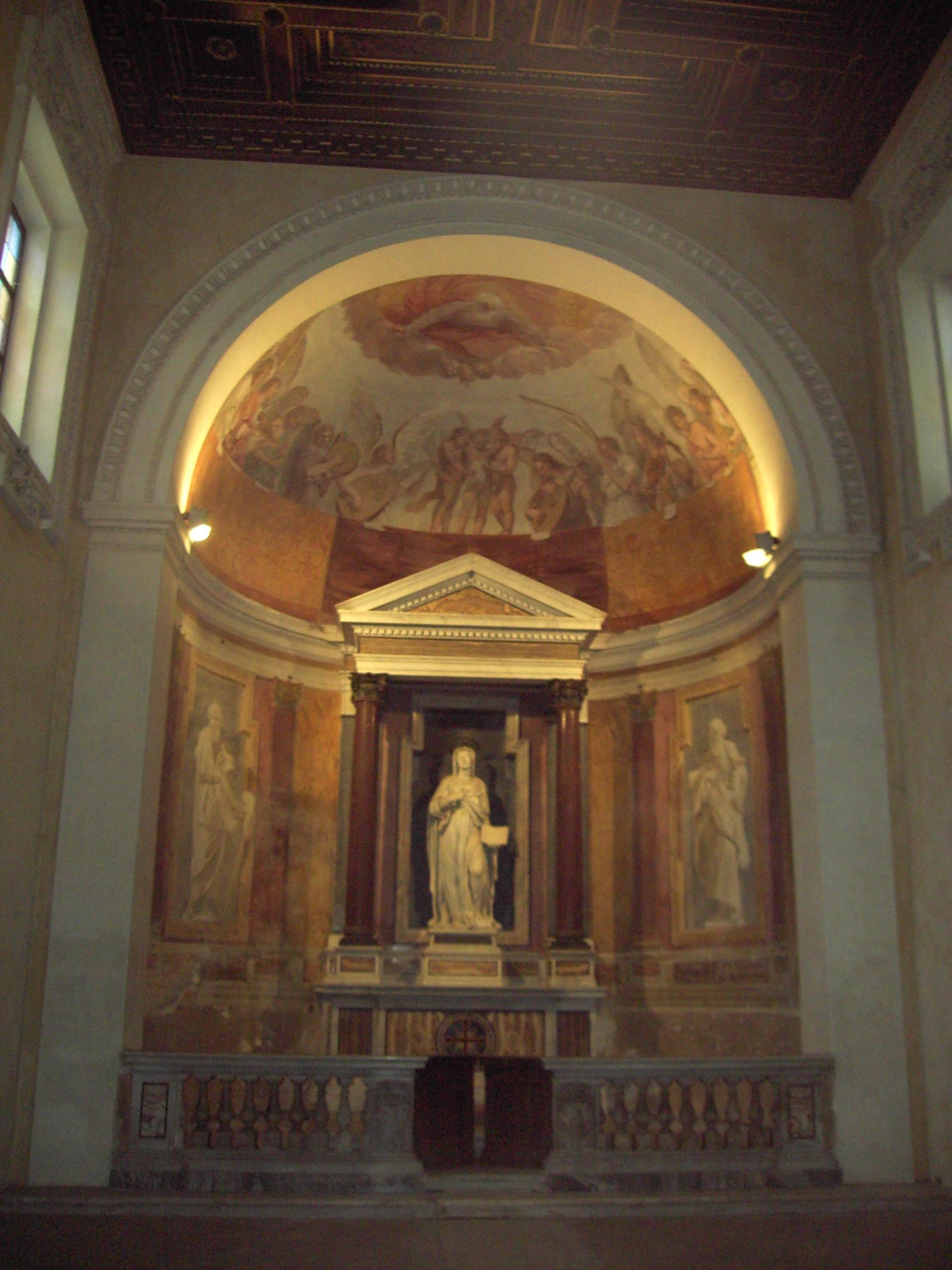
Oratorio S Silvia, San Gregorio Magno al Celio

The veneration of Silvia is of early date. She was honoured by the Romans as a type of a Christian widow. Silvia had built a chapel in her house on the Aventine. In 645, the monks from the monastery of Mar Saba (Palestine) settled in this house, and devoted it to the celebration of Saint Sabas.

Pope Clement VIII (1592–1605) inserted her name under 3 November in the Roman Martyrology. She is invoked by pregnant women for a safe delivery. There is a chapel dedicated to Santa Silvia in San Gregorio Magno al Celio.

Two of her relatives, sisters-in-law Trasilla and Emiliana, are also venerated as saints, as well as her other sister-in-law Gordiana, and her husband Gordianus.
