= Pseudo-Cyprian =

Start of the Pseudo-Cyprianic De laude martyrii from the manuscript Paris, BnF lat. 10592 of the 5th or 6th century

Pseudo-Cyprian is the conventional designation for the anonymous authors of Latin works falsely attributed to Cyprian of Carthage (died 258). These works do not have a common transmission history. Most are not forgeries, but were texts mistakenly attributed to Cyprian from an early date in their transmission. In many cases the works were taken to be authentic until modern times.

In addition, there is a corpus of magical writings and related writings attributed to a composite figure of Cyprian of Carthage and Cyprian of Antioch.

== Pseudepigrapha ==
The Pseudo-Cyprianic corpus (or Pseudo-Cyprianea) can be divided into four groups. The first group is a set of treatises that was copied from an early date alongside authentic letters and became part of larger letter collections, acquiring Cyprianic attribution along the way. These include:

- De laude martyrii (On the Glory of Martyrdom), mentioned in a stichometry of a Cyprianic manuscript from 365
- De rebaptismate (On Rebaptism)
- De aleatoribus (On Gamblers)
- De duobus montibus Sina et Sion (On the Two Mountains Sinai and Zion)
- Tractatus de centesima, sexagesima, tricesima (On the Hundredfold, the Sixtyfold and the Thirtyfold Reward)
- Celsi cuiusdam ad Vigilium episcopum de Judaica incredulitate (To Bishop Vigilius Concerning Jewish Unbelief)
- De bono pudicitiae (On the Benefit of Purity), now ascribed to Novatian
- De spectaculis (On the Public Shows), now ascribed to Novatian
- Adversus Judaeos (Against the Jews), also mentioned in the stichometry of 365
- Ad Novatianum (To Novatian)
- Ad plebem Carthaginis (To the People of Carthage), actually a Donatist forgery

The second group consists of late antique texts that circulated independently of Cyprian's authentic letters. It includes:

- Exhortatio de paenitentia (Exhortation to Repentance)
- Carmen ad quendam senatorem (Poem to a Senator)
- Carmen ad Flavium Felicem de resurrectione mortuorum (Poem to Flavius Felix on the Resurrection of the Dead)
- Hymnus de pascha or De cruce Domini (Hymn on the Pascha, or On the Cross of the Lord)
- De pascha computus (On Computing the Paschal Feast)
- Cena Cypriani (Cyprian's Feast)
- two prayers, called Oratio I and II

The third group consists of texts that only came to be attributed to Cyprian at a relatively late date. It includes:

- Ad Turasium (To Turasius), attributed to Cyprian from the 11th century, also attributed to Jerome
- De singularitate clericorum (On the Singularity of Clerics), attributed to Cyprian in the 12th century
- Expositio symboli (Exposition of the Symbol), actually written by Rufinus of Aquileia, mistakenly attributed to Cyprian from the 12th century
- De duodecim abusivis saeculi (On the Twelve Abuses of the World), a 7th-century work attributed to Cyprian during the Carolingian Renaissance, sometimes attributed to Augustine of Hippo
- De voluntate Dei (On the Will of God), sermon from a single manuscript of the 8th or 9th century

The fourth group consists of texts first attributed to Cyprian only in printed editions of his works. It includes:

- Revelatio capitis beati Johannis Baptistae (Revelation of the Head of Blessed John the Baptist), published in the first edition of Cyprian's works by Giovanni Andrea Bussi in 1471
- Ad Fortunatum de duplici martyrio (To Fortunatus on the Twofold Martyrdom), published by Desiderius Erasmus in 1530 and probably also forged by him
- several works of Arnold of Bonneval were published under Cyprian's name for better sales and sometimes taken as authentic by later editors

== Disputed works ==
Two works attributed to Cyprian are of disputed authenticity:

- Quod idola dii non sint (That Idols are Not Gods), not generally accepted as Cyprian's
- Ad Silvanum, a letter that is generally accepted as Cyprian's

== Other Cyprians ==
In addition, the works of Cyprianus Gallus have sometimes been published with those of Cyprian of Carthage, but there is no reason to think the two authors to be the same person.

The case of Cyprian of Antioch is unique. Legend told that he was a magician whose spells failed to woo Justina and was thus converted to her faith, the two then dying together as martyrs during the Diocletianic Persecution. The figure of the legendary magician had already begun to merge with that of Cyprian of Carthage by 379, as evidence by a sermon delivered by Gregory of Nazianzus on Cyprian's feast day. An autobiography, Confessio seu paenitentia Cypriani, is attributed to Cyprian the magician (i.e., Pseudo-Cyprian of Antioch). The magician inspired numerous later pseudepigrapha, including an erotic spell and a Homily on Neglecting Sunday Mass in Coptic and a Copto-Arabic Prayer of Cyprian.

== Editions ==
- Mattei, Paul; Ciccolini, Laetitia, eds. (2016). Pseudo-Cyprianea I: De habitu virginum. Corpus Christianorum Series Latina. Vol. 3F. Brepols.
- Martin, Lucie, ed. (2025). Pseudo-Cyprianea II: Carmen ad Flavium Felicem de resurrectione mortuorum. Corpus Christianorum Series Latina. Vol. 3G. Brepols.
- Mantelli, Sincero; Ricciardi, Ilaria, eds. (2026). Pseudo-Cyprianea III: De singularitate clericorum; Tractatus de centesima, de sexagesima, de tricesima. Corpus Christianorum Series Latina. Vol. 3H. Brepols.
