= Heptateuchos =

Heptateuchos may refer to:

- Heptateuch, the first sevent books of the Hebrew Bible
- Heptateuchos, a rendition of the Heptateuch in Latin epic verse by Cyprianus Gallus
