= Pope Gregory I =

64th Bishop of Rome; head of the Roman Catholic Church from AD 590 to 604

Pope Saint Gregory I
- Bishop of Rome
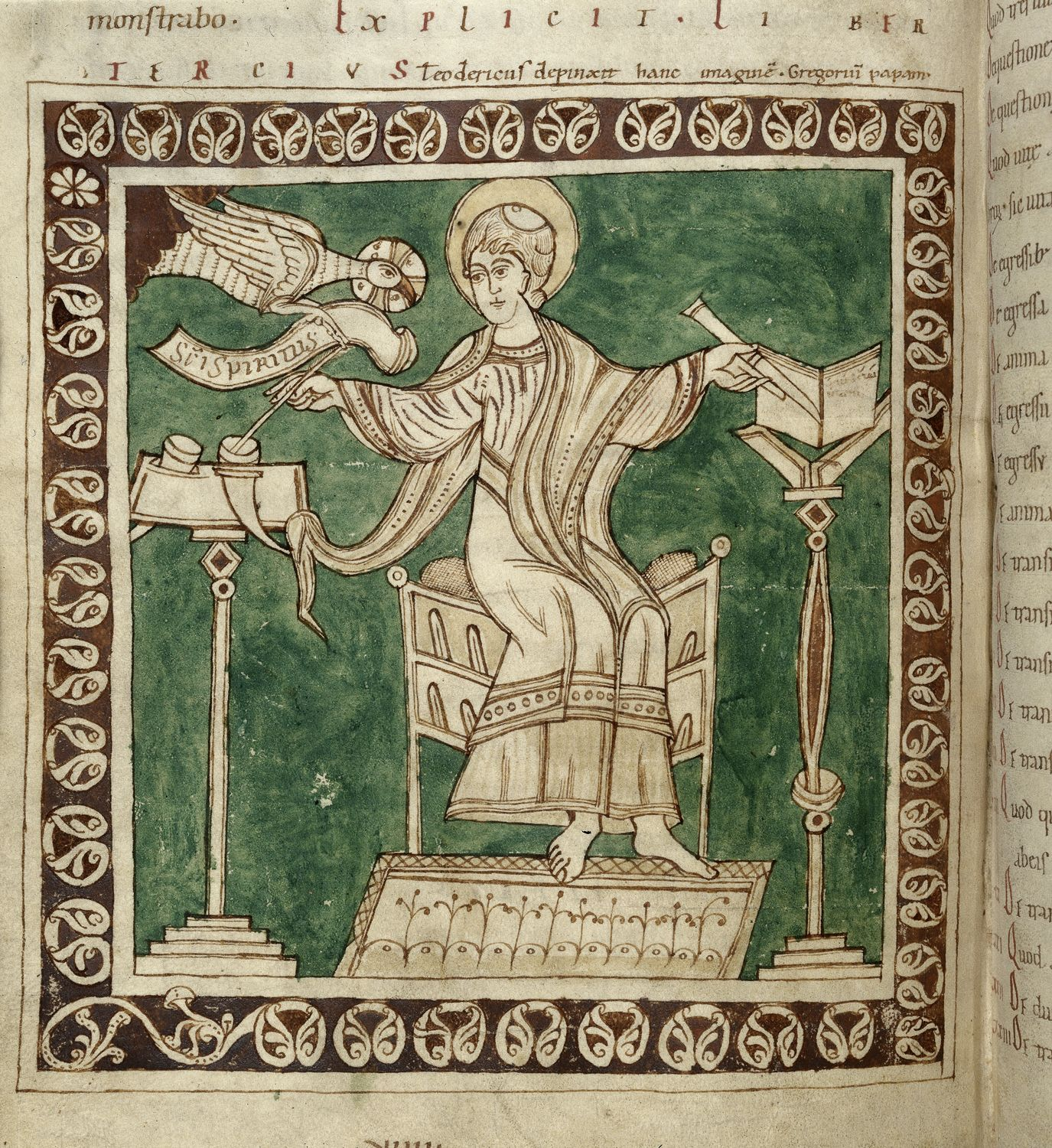
- Miniature of Gregory the Great writing, in a 12th-century copy of his Dialogues
- Church: Chalcedonian Christianity
- Papacy began: 3 September 590
- Papacy ended: 12 March 604
- Predecessor: Pelagius II
- Successor: Sabinian

Orders
- Consecration: 3 September 590

Personal details
- Born: c. 540 Rome
- Died: 12 March 604 (aged 63–64) Rome, Duchy of Rome, Exarchate of Ravenna, Eastern Roman Empire
- Buried: St. Peter's Basilica (1606)
- Residence: Rome
- Parents: Gordianus; Silvia

Sainthood
- Feast day: 3 September (Latin Church); 12 March (Eastern Orthodox Church, Latin Church pre-1969, Eastern Churches, Anglicanism, Lutheranism)
- Venerated in: Catholic Church; Eastern Orthodox Church; Anglicanism; Lutheranism
- Canonized: 12 March 604
- Attributes: Papal tiara; Papal vestments; Papal cross; book; quill
- Patronage: Musicians, singers, students, and teachers

Pope Gregory I (Latin: Gregorius I; Gregorio I; c. 540 – 12 March 604), commonly known as Saint Gregory the Great (Latin: Sanctus Gregorius Magnus; Italian: San Gregorio Magno), was the 64th Bishop of Rome from 3 September 590 until his death on 12 March 604. (Note: Gregory had come to be known as 'the Great' by the late ninth century, a title which is still applied to him. See Moorhead 2005, p. 1)

Gregory was originally from Rome, a Roman senator's son, and himself the prefect of Rome at 30. He lived in a monastery that he established on his family estate before becoming a papal ambassador and then pope. During his papacy, his administration greatly surpassed that of the emperors Maurice and Theodosius in improving the welfare of the people of Rome. Gregory regained papal authority in Spain and France and sent missionaries to England, including Augustine of Canterbury and Paulinus of York. Gregory saw Franks, Lombards, and Visigoths align with Rome in religion from their Arian Christian alliances. The realignment of barbarian allegiance to Rome shaped medieval Europe. He also combated the Donatist heresy, popular particularly in North Africa at the time.

Gregory is also well known for his writings, which were more prolific than those of any of the previous popes. The epithet Saint Gregory the Dialogist has been attached to him in Eastern Christianity because of his Dialogues. Throughout the Middle Ages, he was known as "the Father of Christian Worship" because of his exceptional efforts in revising the Roman worship of his day. His contributions to the development of the Divine Liturgy of the Presanctified Gifts, still in use in the Byzantine Rite, were so significant that he is generally recognized as its de facto author.

Gregory is honored, along with Augustine, Jerome and Ambrose, as one of the four Great Latin Church Fathers. Immediately after his death, Gregory was canonized by popular acclaim. He is the second of the three Popes listed in the Annuario Pontificio with the title "the Great", alongside Popes Leo I and Nicholas I.

== Early life ==
Gregory was born c. 540 (Note: Gregory mentions in Dialogue 3.2 that he was alive when Totila attempted to murder Carbonius, Bishop of Populonia, probably in 546. In a letter of 598 (Register, Book 9, Letter 1) he rebukes Bishop Januarius of Cagliari, Sardinia, excusing himself for not observing 1 Timothy 5.1, which cautions against rebuking elders. Timothy 5.9 defines elderly women to be 60 and over, which would probably apply to all. Gregory appears not to consider himself an elder, limiting his birth to no earlier than 539, but 540 is the typical selection. See Dudden 1905, pp. 3, notes 1–3 The presumption of 540 has continued in modern times – see for example Richards 1980) in Rome, at that time recently reconquered by the Eastern Roman Empire from the Ostrogoths. His parents named him Gregorius, which according to Ælfric of Eynsham in An Homily on the Birth-Day of S. Gregory, "is a Greek Name, which signifies in the Latin Tongue, Vigilantius, that is in English, Watchful". The medieval writer who provided this etymology (Note: The translator goes on to state that "Paulus Diaconus, who first writ the life of St. Gregory, and is followed by all the after Writers on that subject, observes that ex Greco eloquio in nostra lingua ... invigilator, seu vigilant sonnet." However, Paul the deacon is too late for the first vita, or life.) did not hesitate to apply it to the life of Gregory. Ælfric states, "He was very diligent in God's Commandments." (Note: The name is biblical, derived from New Testament contexts: grēgorein is a present, continuous aspect, meaning to be watchful of forsaking Christ. It is derived from a more ancient perfect, egrēgora, "roused from sleep", of egeirein, "to awaken someone." see Thayer 1962)

Gregory was born into a wealthy noble Roman family with close connections to the church. His father, Gordianus, a patrician who served as a senator and for a time was the Prefect of the City of Rome, also held the position of Regionarius in the church, though nothing further is known about that position. Gregory's mother, Silvia, was well-born, and had a married sister, Pateria, in Sicily. His mother and two paternal aunts, Trasilla and Emiliana, are honored by Catholic and Orthodox churches as saints. Gregory's great-great-grandfather had been Pope Felix III. (Note: Whether III or IV depends on whether Antipope Felix II is to be considered pope.) Gregory's election to the throne of St. Peter made his family the most distinguished clerical dynasty of the period.

The family owned and resided in a villa suburbana on the Clivus Scauri on the Caelian Hill, (now the Via di San Gregorio). It branched from the road having the former palaces of the Roman emperors on the Palatine Hill opposite. The north of the street runs into the Colosseum; the south, the Circus Maximus. In Gregory's day, the ancient buildings were in ruins and were privately owned. Villas covered the area. Gregory's family also owned working estates in Sicily and around Rome. Gregory later had portraits of his parents frescoed in their former home on the Caelian and these were described 300 years later by John the Deacon. Gordianus was tall with a long face and light eyes. He wore a beard. Silvia was tall, had a round face, blue eyes and a cheerful look. They had another son whose name and fate are unknown.

Gregory was born into a period of upheaval in Italy. From 542 the Plague of Justinian swept through the provinces of the empire, including Italy. The plague caused famine, panic, and sometimes rioting. In some parts of the country, over a third of the population was wiped out or destroyed, with heavy spiritual and emotional effects on the people of the empire. Politically, although the Western Roman Empire had long since vanished in favor of the Gothic kings of Italy, during the 540s Italy was gradually retaken from the Goths by Justinian I, emperor of the Eastern Roman Empire ruling from Constantinople. As the fighting was mainly in the north, the young Gregory probably saw little of it. Rome was sacked and vacated by Totila in 546, destroying most of its population, but in 549 he invited those who were still alive to return to the empty and ruined streets. It has been hypothesized that young Gregory and his parents retired during that intermission to their Sicilian estates, to return in 549. The war was over in Rome by 552, and a subsequent invasion of the Franks was defeated in 554.

Like most young men of his position in Roman society, Gregory was well educated, learning grammar, rhetoric, the sciences, literature, and law; he excelled in all these fields. Gregory of Tours reported that "in grammar, dialectic and rhetoric ... he was second to none". He wrote correct Latin, but his claim not to have known Greek seems to be an exaggeration given his excellent education and time spent in Constantinople. He knew Latin authors, natural science, history, mathematics, and music and had such a "fluency with imperial law" that he may have trained in it "as a preparation for a career in public life". He became a government official, advancing quickly in rank to become, like his father, Prefect of Rome, the highest civil office in the city, when only thirty-three years old.

The monks of the Monastery of St. Andrew, established by Gregory at the ancestral home on the Caelian, had a portrait of him made after his death, which John the Deacon also saw in the 9th century. He reports the picture of a man who was "rather bald" and had a "tawny" beard like his father's and a face that was intermediate in shape between his mother's and father's. The hair that he had on the sides was long and carefully curled. His nose was "thin and straight" and "slightly aquiline". "His forehead was high." He had thick, "subdivided" lips and a chin "of a comely prominence" and "beautiful hands".

In the modern era, Gregory is often depicted as a man at the border, poised between the Roman and Germanic worlds, between East and West, and above all, perhaps, between the ancient and medieval epochs.

== Monastic years ==
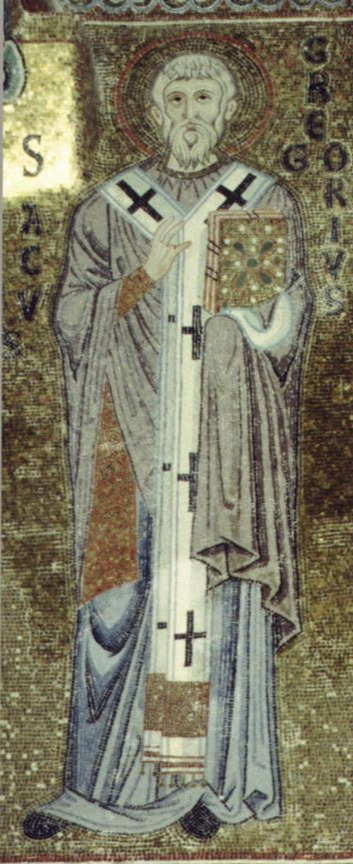
Mosaic from the Cefalù Cathedral

On his father's death, Gregory converted his family villa into a monastery dedicated to Andrew the Apostle (after his death, it was rededicated as San Gregorio Magno al Celio). In his life of contemplation, Gregory concluded that "in that silence of the heart, while we keep watch within through contemplation, we are as if asleep to all things that are without."

Gregory had a deep respect for the monastic life and particularly the vow of poverty. Thus, when it came to light that a monk lying on his deathbed had stolen three gold pieces, Gregory, as a remedial punishment, forced the monk to die alone, then threw his body and coins on a manure heap to rot with a condemnation, "Take your money with you to perdition." Gregory believed that punishment for sins can begin, even in this life before death. However, in time, after the monk's death, Gregory had 30 Masses offered for the man to assist his soul before the final judgment. He viewed being a monk as the "ardent quest for the vision of our Creator." His three paternal aunts were nuns renowned for their sanctity. However, after the eldest two, Trasilla and Emiliana, died after seeing a vision of their ancestor Pope Felix III, the youngest soon abandoned the religious life and married the steward of her estate. Gregory's response to this family scandal was that "many are called, but few are chosen." Gregory's mother is herself a saint.

Eventually, Pope Pelagius II ordained Gregory a deacon and solicited his help in trying to heal the schism of the Three Chapters in northern Italy. However, this schism was not healed until well after Gregory was gone.

== Apocrisiariate (579–585) ==
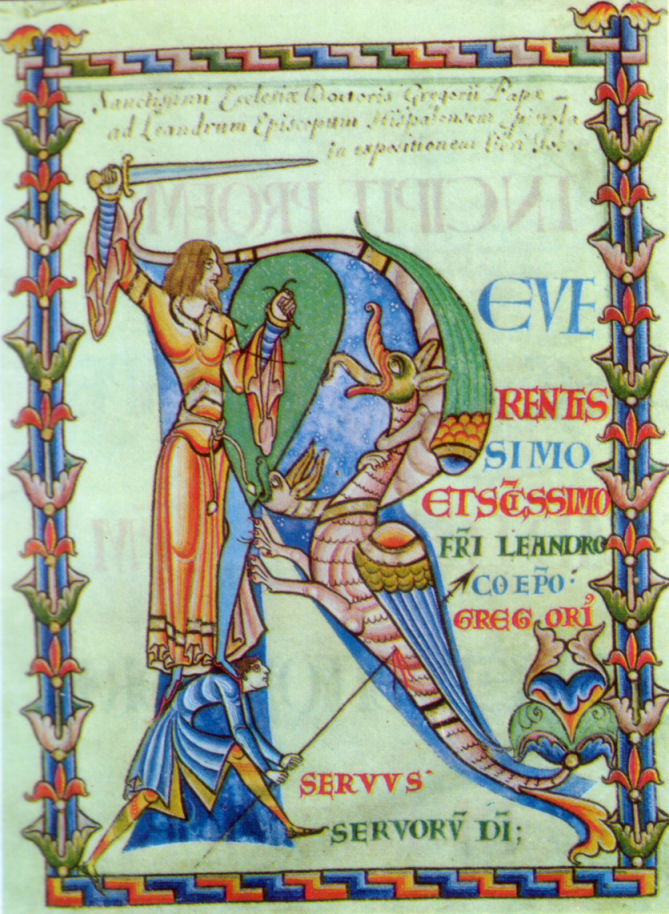
Illumination in a 12th-century manuscript of a letter of Gregory's to Leander of Seville

In 579, Pelagius II chose Gregory as his apocrisiarius (ambassador to the imperial court in Constantinople), a post Gregory would hold until 586. Gregory was part of the Roman delegation (both lay and clerical) that arrived in Constantinople in 578 to ask the emperor for military aid against the Lombards. With the Byzantine military focused on the East, these entreaties proved unsuccessful; in 584, Pelagius II wrote to Gregory as apocrisiarius, detailing the hardships that Rome was experiencing under the Lombards and asking him to ask Emperor Maurice to send a relief force. Maurice, however, had long ago determined to limit his efforts against the Lombards to intrigue and diplomacy, pitting the Franks against them. It soon became obvious to Gregory that the Byzantine emperors were unlikely to send such a force, given their more immediate difficulties with the Persians in the East and the Avars and Slavs to the North.

=== Controversy with Eutychius ===
According to Ekonomou, "if Gregory's principal task was to plead Rome's cause before the emperor, there seems to have been little left for him to do once imperial policy toward Italy became evident. Papal representatives who pressed their claims with excessive vigor could quickly become a nuisance and find themselves excluded from the imperial presence altogether". Gregory had already drawn an imperial rebuke for his lengthy canonical writings on the subject of the legitimacy of John III Scholasticus, who had occupied the Patriarchate of Constantinople for twelve years prior to the return of Eutychius (who had been driven out by Justinian). Gregory turned to cultivating connections with the Byzantine elite of the city, where he became extremely popular with the city's upper class, "especially aristocratic women". Ekonomou surmises that "while Gregory may have become spiritual father to a large and important segment of Constantinople's aristocracy, this relationship did not significantly advance the interests of Rome before the emperor". Although the writings of John the Deacon claim that Gregory "labored diligently for the relief of Italy", there is no evidence that his tenure accomplished much towards any of the objectives of Pelagius II.

In Constantinople, Gregory took issue with the aged Eutychius of Constantinople, who had recently published a treatise, now lost, on the General Resurrection. Eutychius maintained that the resurrected body "will be more subtle than air, and no longer palpable". (Note: The dictionary account is apparently based on Bede, Book II, Chapter 1, who used the expression "...impalpable, of finer texture than wind and air.")

Gregory's theological disputes with Patriarch Eutychius would leave a "bitter taste for the theological speculation of the East" with Gregory that continued to influence him well into his own papacy. According to Western sources, Gregory's very public debate with Eutychius culminated in an exchange before Tiberius II where Gregory supported the view that Christ was corporeal and palpable after his Resurrection; allegedly as a result of this exchange, Tiberius II ordered Eutychius's writings burned. Ekonomou views this argument, though exaggerated in Western sources, as Gregory's "one achievement of an otherwise fruitless apokrisiariat". Gregory relied on Scripture because he could not read the untranslated Greek authoritative works. Shortly after, both Gregory and Eutychius became ill; Gregory recovered, but Eutychius died on 5 April 582, at age 70. On his deathbed, Eutychius recanted impalpability, and Gregory dropped the matter.

== Papacy ==
Gregory left Constantinople for Rome in 585, returning to his monastery on the Caelian Hill. Gregory was elected by acclamation to succeed Pelagius II in 590, when the latter died of the plague spreading through the city. Gregory was approved by an Imperial iussio from Constantinople the following September (as was the norm during the Byzantine Papacy).

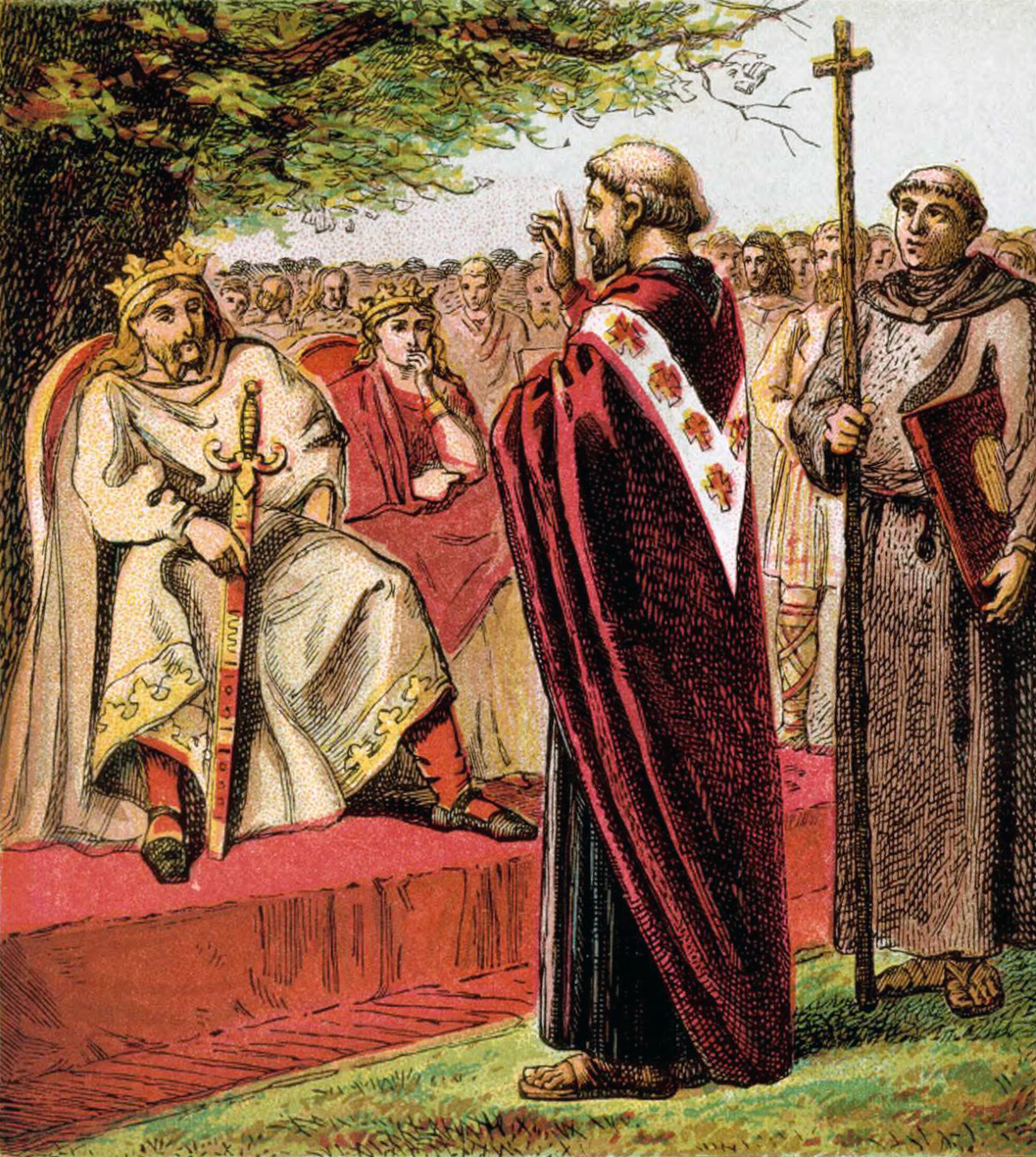
Augustine of Canterbury on his mission to Anglo-Saxon England

Gregory was more inclined to remain retired into the monastic lifestyle of contemplation. In texts of all genres, especially those produced in his first year as pope, Gregory bemoaned the burden of office and mourned the loss of the undisturbed life of prayer he had once enjoyed as a monk. When he became pope in 590, among his first acts was writing a series of letters disavowing any ambition to the throne of Peter and praising the contemplative life of the monks. He wrote to Emperor Maurice, requesting that he not confirm his election. However, the letter was intercepted by the prefect of Rome.

At that time, for various reasons, the Holy See had not exerted effective leadership in the West since the pontificate of Gelasius I. The episcopacy in Gaul was drawn from the great territorial families, and identified with them: the parochial horizon of Gregory's contemporary, Gregory of Tours, may be considered typical; in Visigothic Spain the bishops had little contact with Rome; in Italy the territories which had de facto fallen under the administration of the papacy were beset by the violent Lombard dukes and the rivalry of the Byzantines in the Exarchate of Ravenna and in the south.

Pope Gregory had strong convictions on missions: "Almighty God places good men in authority that He may impart through them the gifts of His mercy to their subjects. And this we find to be the case with the British over whom you have been appointed to rule, that through the blessings bestowed on you the blessings of heaven might be bestowed on your people also." He is credited with re-energizing the Church's missionary work among the non-Christian peoples of northern Europe. He is most famous for sending a mission, often called the Gregorian mission, under Augustine of Canterbury, prior of Saint Andrew's, where he had possibly succeeded Gregory, to evangelize the pagan Anglo-Saxons of Britain. It seems that the pope had never forgotten the Anglo-Saxon slaves whom he had once seen in the Roman Forum. The mission was successful, and it was from England that missionaries later set out for the Netherlands and Germany. The preaching of non-heretical Christian faith and the elimination of all deviations from it were a key element in Gregory's worldview, and it constituted one of the major continuing policies of his pontificate. Pope Gregory the Great urged his followers on the value of bathing as a bodily need.

Pope Gregory also significantly influenced Catholic teaching on the Jews. Based on the writings of St Paul and St Augustine of Hippo, but also existing Roman law, he declared Jews should be protected by Christians and allowed the practise of Judaism unharmed. In his letter to the bishop of Palermo he laid out that just as Jews were not allowed to pursue more freedoms than Roman law allowed their position, so Christians were not allowed to infringe the rights that Jews had. This letter became later the template for papal protective letters for the Jews in the later Middle Ages, like Calixtus II's pontifical bull Sicut Judaeis ("Just as the Jews"). Importantly, though he also encouraged bishops to convert the Jews, Pope Gregory insisted that Jews should not be forced to convert or physically harmed.

It is said he was declared a saint immediately after his death by "popular acclamation".

In his official documents, Gregory was the first to make extensive use of the term "Servant of the Servants of God" (servus servorum Dei) as a papal title, thus initiating a practice that was to be followed by most subsequent popes.

=== Alms ===
The Church had a practice from early times of passing on a large portion of the donations it received from its members as alms. Gregory is known for his extensive administrative system of charitable relief of the poor at Rome. The poor were predominantly refugees from the incursions of the Lombards. The philosophy under which he devised this system is that the wealth belonged to the poor and the church was only its steward. He received lavish donations from the wealthy families of Rome, who, following his own example, were eager, by doing so, to expiate their sins. He gave alms equally as lavishly both individually and en masse. He wrote in letters: "I have frequently charged you ... to act as my representative ... to relieve the poor in their distress" and "I hold the office of steward to the property of the poor".

In Gregory's time, the Church in Rome received donations of many different kinds: consumables such as food and clothing; investment property: real estate and works of art; and capital goods, or revenue-generating property, such as the Sicilian latifundia, or agricultural estates. The Church already had a system for circulating the consumables to the poor: associated with each of the main city churches was a deacon. He was given a building from which the poor could apply for assistance at any time. (Note: Later, these deacons became cardinals and from the oratories attached to the buildings grew churches.)

The circumstances in which Gregory became pope in 590 were of ruination. The Lombards held the greater part of Italy. Their depredations had brought the economy to a standstill. They camped nearly at the gates of Rome. The city itself was crowded with refugees from all walks of life, who lived in the streets and had few of the necessities of life. The seat of government was far from Rome in Constantinople and appeared unable to undertake the relief of Italy.

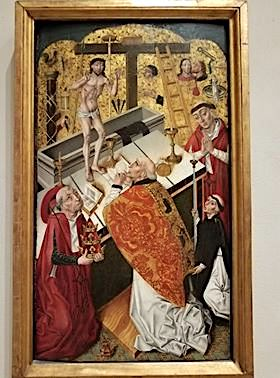
Mass of St. Gregory, c. 1490, attributed to Diego de la Cruz, oil and gold on panel (Philadelphia Museum of Art)

In 590, Gregory could not wait for Constantinople any longer. He organized the resources of the church into an administration for general relief. In doing so, he evidenced a talent and intuitive understanding of the principles of accounting, which was not to be invented for centuries. The church already had basic accounting documents: every expense was recorded in journals called regesta, "lists" of amounts, recipients and circumstances. Revenue was recorded in polyptici, "books". Many of these polyptici were ledgers recording the operating expenses of the church and the assets, the patrimonia. A central papal administration, the notarii, under a chief, the primicerius notariorum, kept the ledgers and issued brevia patrimonii, or lists of property for which each rector was responsible.

Gregory began by aggressively requiring his churchmen to seek out and relieve needy persons and reprimanded them if they did not. In a letter to a subordinate in Sicily he wrote: "I asked you most of all to take care of the poor. And if you knew of people in poverty, you should have pointed them out ... I desire that you give the woman, Pateria, forty solidi for the children's shoes and forty bushels of grain". Soon he was replacing administrators who would not cooperate with those who would and at the same time adding more in a build-up to a great plan that he had in mind. He understood that expenses must be matched by income. To pay for his increased expenses, he liquidated the investment property and paid the expenses in cash according to a budget recorded in the polity. The churchmen were paid four times a year and also personally given a golden coin for their trouble.

Money, however, was no substitute for food in a city that was on the brink of famine. The church now owned between 1,300 and 1,800 square miles (3,400 and 4,700 km^{2}) of revenue-generating farmland divided into large sections called patrimonia. It produced goods of all kinds, which were sold, but Gregory intervened and had the goods shipped to Rome for distribution in the diaconia. He gave orders to step up production, set quotas, and put an administrative structure in place to carry it out. At the bottom was the rusticus who produced the goods. Some rustici were or owned slaves. He turned over part of his produce to a conductor from whom he leased the land. The latter reported to an actionarius, who reported to a defensor, who reported to a rector. Grain, wine, cheese, meat, fish, and oil began to arrive at Rome in large quantities, where it was given away for nothing as alms.

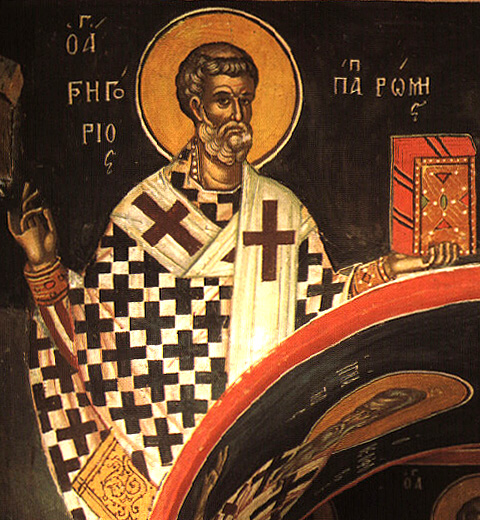
Fresco of Saint Gregory the Pope of Rome at Stavronikita - Theophanes the Cretan

Distributions to qualified persons were monthly. However, a certain proportion of the population lived in the streets or were too ill or infirm to pick up their monthly food supply. Gregory sent out a small army of charitable persons, mainly monks, every morning with prepared food to them. It is said that he would not dine until the indigent were fed. When he did dine he shared the family table, which he had saved (and which still exists), with 12 indigent guests. To the needy living in wealthy homes he sent meals he had cooked with his own hands as gifts to spare them the indignity of receiving charity. Hearing of the death of an indigent in a back room, he was depressed for days, entertaining for a time the conceit that he had failed in his duty and was a murderer.

Such charitable deeds were viewed favourably by the Roman people. They now looked to the papacy for government, ignoring the state at Constantinople. The office of urban prefect went without candidates.

== Works ==
=== Liturgical reforms ===
John the Deacon wrote that Pope Gregory I made a general revision of the liturgy of the Pre-Tridentine Mass, "removing many things, changing a few, adding some". In his own letters, Gregory remarks that he moved the Pater Noster (Our Father) to immediately after the Roman Canon and immediately before the Fraction. This position is still maintained today in the Roman Liturgy. The pre-Gregorian position is evident in the Ambrosian Rite. Gregory added material to the Hanc Igitur of the Roman Canon and established the nine Kyries (a vestigial remnant of the litany which was originally at that place) at the beginning of Mass. He forbade deacons to perform any of the musical portions of the Mass other than singing the Gospel.

Sacramentaries directly influenced by Gregorian reforms are referred to as Sacrementaria Gregoriana. Roman and other Western liturgies since this era have a number of prayers that change to reflect the feast or liturgical season; these variations are visible in the collects and prefaces as well as in the Roman Canon itself.

==== Divine Liturgy of the Presanctified Gifts ====
In the Eastern Orthodox Church and Eastern Catholic Churches, Gregory is credited as the primary influence in constructing the more penitential Divine Liturgy of the Presanctified Gifts, a fully separate form of the Divine Liturgy in the Byzantine Rite adapted to the needs of the season of Great Lent. Its Roman Rite equivalent is the Mass of the Presanctified used only on Good Friday. The Syriac Liturgy of the Presanctified Gifts continues to be used in the Malankara Rite, a variant of the West Syrian Rite historically practiced in the Malankara Church of India, and now practiced by the several churches that descended from it and at some occasions in the Assyrian Church of the East.

==== Gregorian chant ====
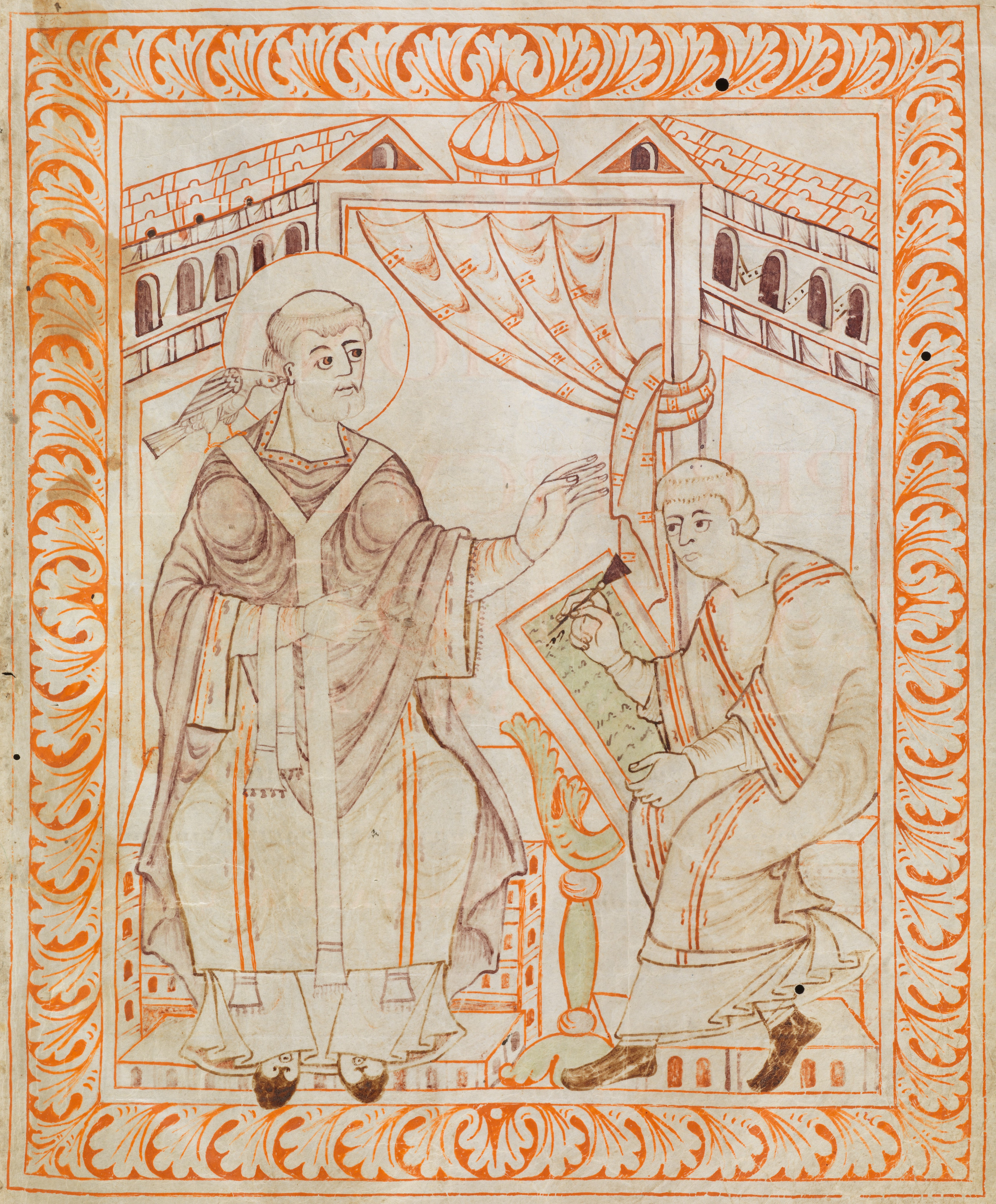
Antiphonary of Hartker of the monastery of Saint Gall

The mainstream form of Western plainchant, standardized in the late 9th century, was attributed to Pope Gregory I and so took the name of Gregorian chant. The earliest such attribution is in John the Deacon's 873 biography of Gregory, almost three centuries after the pope's death, and the chant that bears his name "is the result of the fusion of Roman and Frankish elements which took place in the Franco-German empire under Pepin, Charlemagne and their successors".

=== Writings ===
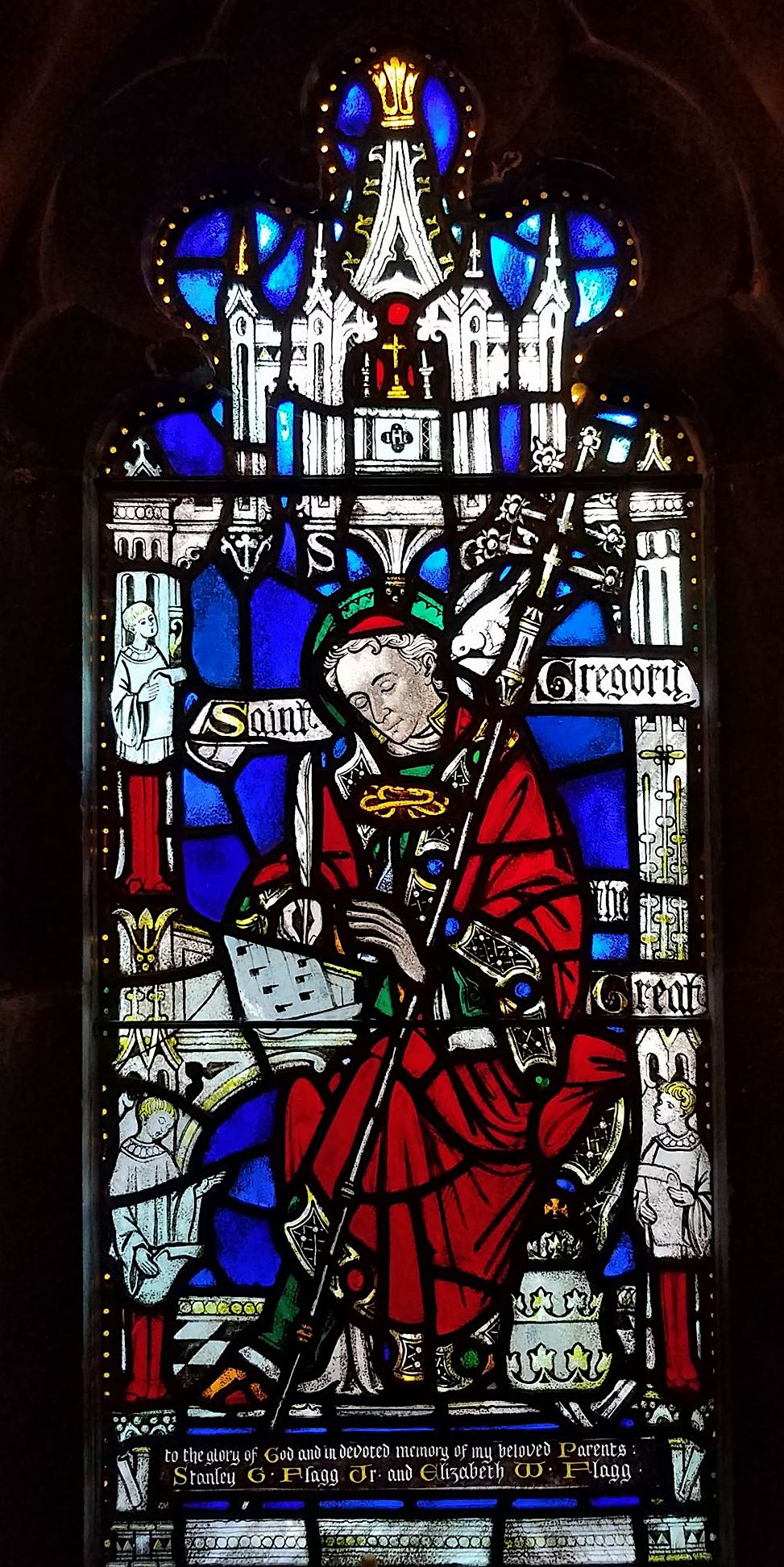
St. Gregory the Great window, Episcopal Church of the Good Shepherd (Rosemont, Pennsylvania) US

Gregory is commonly credited with founding the medieval papacy and so many attribute the beginning of medieval spirituality to him. Gregory is the only pope between the fifth and the eleventh centuries whose correspondence and writings have survived enough to form a comprehensive corpus. Some of his writings are:

- Moralia in Job. This is one of the longest patristic works. It was possibly finished as early as 591. It is based on talks Gregory gave on the Book of Job to his "brethren" who accompanied him to Constantinople. The work as we have it is the result of Gregory's revision and completion of it soon after he acceded to the papal office.
- Pastoral Care (Liber regulae pastoralis), in which he contrasted the role of bishops as pastors of their flock with their position as nobles of the church: the definitive statement of the nature of the episcopal office. This was probably begun before he was elected pope and finished in 591.
- Dialogues, a collection of four books of miracles, signs, wonders, and healings done by the holy men, mostly monastic, of sixth-century Italy, with the second book entirely devoted to a popular life of Saint Benedict.
- Sermons, including:
  - The 22 Homilae in Hiezechielem (Homilies on Ezekiel), dealing with Ezekiel 1.1–4.3 in Book One, and Ezekiel 40 in Book 2. These were preached during 592–593, the years that the Lombards besieged Rome, and contain some of Gregory's most profound mystical teachings. They were revised eight years later.
  - The Homilae xl in Evangelia (Forty Homilies on the Gospels) for the liturgical year, delivered during 591 and 592, which were seemingly finished by 593. A papyrus fragment from this codex survives in the British Museum, London, UK.
  - Expositio in Canticis Canticorum. Only two of these sermons on the Song of Songs survive, discussing the text up to Song 1.9.
- In Librum primum regum expositio (Commentary on 1 Kings), which scholars now think that this is a work by the 12th-century monk Peter of Cava, who used no longer extant Gregorian material.
- Copies of some 854 letters have survived. During Gregory's time, copies of papal letters were made by scribes into a Registrum (Register), which was then kept in the scrinium. It is known that in the 9th century, when John the Deacon composed his Life of Gregory, the Registrum of Gregory's letters was formed of 14 papyrus rolls (though it is difficult to estimate how many letters this may have represented). Though these original rolls are now lost, the 854 letters have survived in copies made at various later times, the largest single batch of 686 letters being made by order of Adrian I (772–795). The majority of the copies, dating from the 10th to the 15th century, are stored in the Vatican Library.

Gregory wrote over 850 letters in the last 13 years of his life (590–604) that give us an accurate picture of his work. A truly autobiographical presentation is nearly impossible for Gregory. The development of his mind and personality remains speculative.

Opinions of the writings of Gregory vary. "His character strikes us as an ambiguous and enigmatic one", historian Norman Cantor observed. "On the one hand he was an able and determined administrator, a skilled and clever diplomat, a leader of the greatest sophistication and vision; but on the other hand, he appears in his writings as a superstitious and credulous monk, hostile to learning, crudely limited as a theologian, and excessively devoted to saints, miracles, and relics".

== Iconography ==
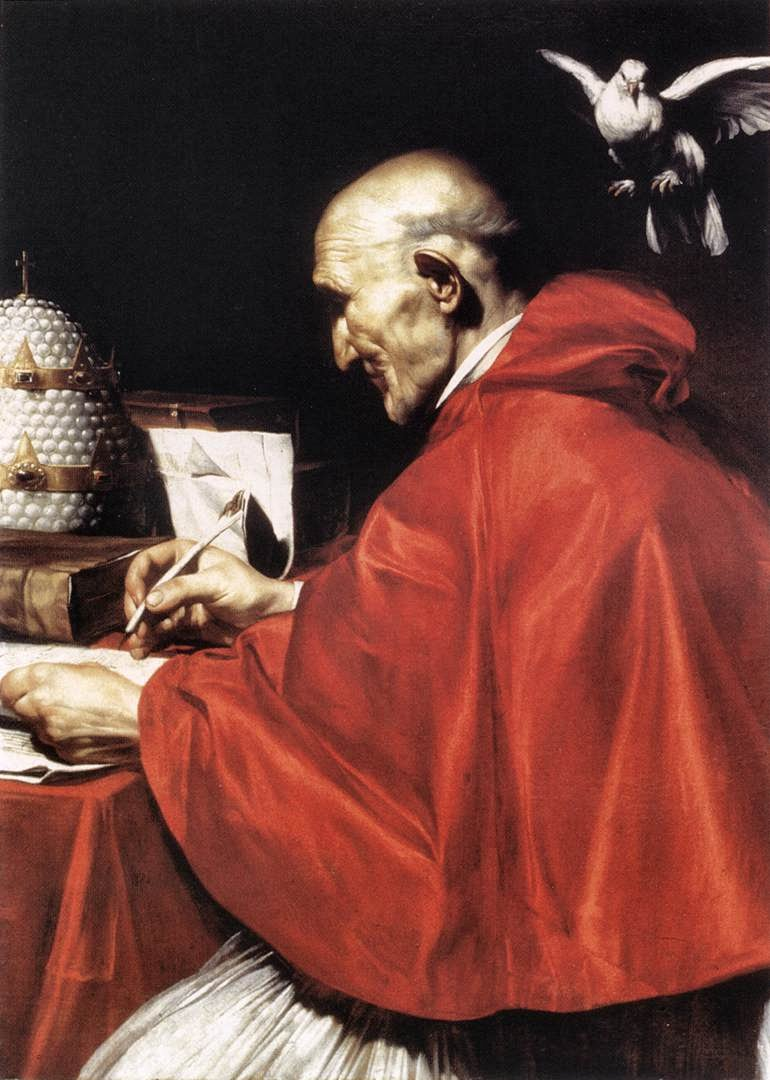
Saint Gregory the Great by José de Ribera

San Gregorio Magno by Francisco Goya, a Romanticist painting

In art, Gregory is usually shown in full pontifical robes with the tiara and double cross, despite his actual habit of dress. Earlier depictions are more likely to show a monastic tonsure and plainer dress. Orthodox icons traditionally show St. Gregory vested as a bishop holding a Gospel Book and blessing with his right hand. It is recorded that he permitted his depiction with a square halo, then used for the living. A dove is his attribute, from the well-known story attributed to his friend Peter the Deacon, (Note: For the various literary accounts, see Anonymous Monk of Whitby 1985, p. 157, n. 110) who tells that when the pope was dictating his homilies on Ezechiel a curtain was drawn between his secretary and himself. As, however, the pope remained silent for long periods at a time, the servant made a hole in the curtain and, looking through, beheld a dove seated upon Gregory's head with its beak between his lips. When the dove withdrew its beak, the pope spoke and the secretary took down his words; but when he became silent, the servant again applied his eye to the hole and saw the dove replaced its beak between his lips.

Ribera's oil painting of Saint Gregory the Great (c. 1614) is from the Giustiniani collection. The painting is conserved in the Galleria Nazionale d'Arte Antica, Rome. The face of Gregory is a caricature of the features described by John the Deacon: total baldness, outthrust chin, beak-like nose, whereas John had described partial baldness, a mildly protruding chin, a slightly aquiline nose, and strikingly good looks. In this picture, Gregory also has his monastic back on the world, which the real Gregory, despite his reclusive intent, was seldom allowed to have.

This scene is shown as a version of the traditional Evangelist portrait (where the Evangelists' symbols are also sometimes shown dictating) from the tenth century onwards. An early example is the dedication miniature from an eleventh-century manuscript of Gregory's Moralia in Job. The miniature shows the scribe, Bebo of Seeon Abbey, presenting the manuscript to the Holy Roman Emperor, Henry II. In the upper left, the author is seen writing the text under divine inspiration. Usually, the dove is shown whispering in Gregory's ear for a clearer composition.

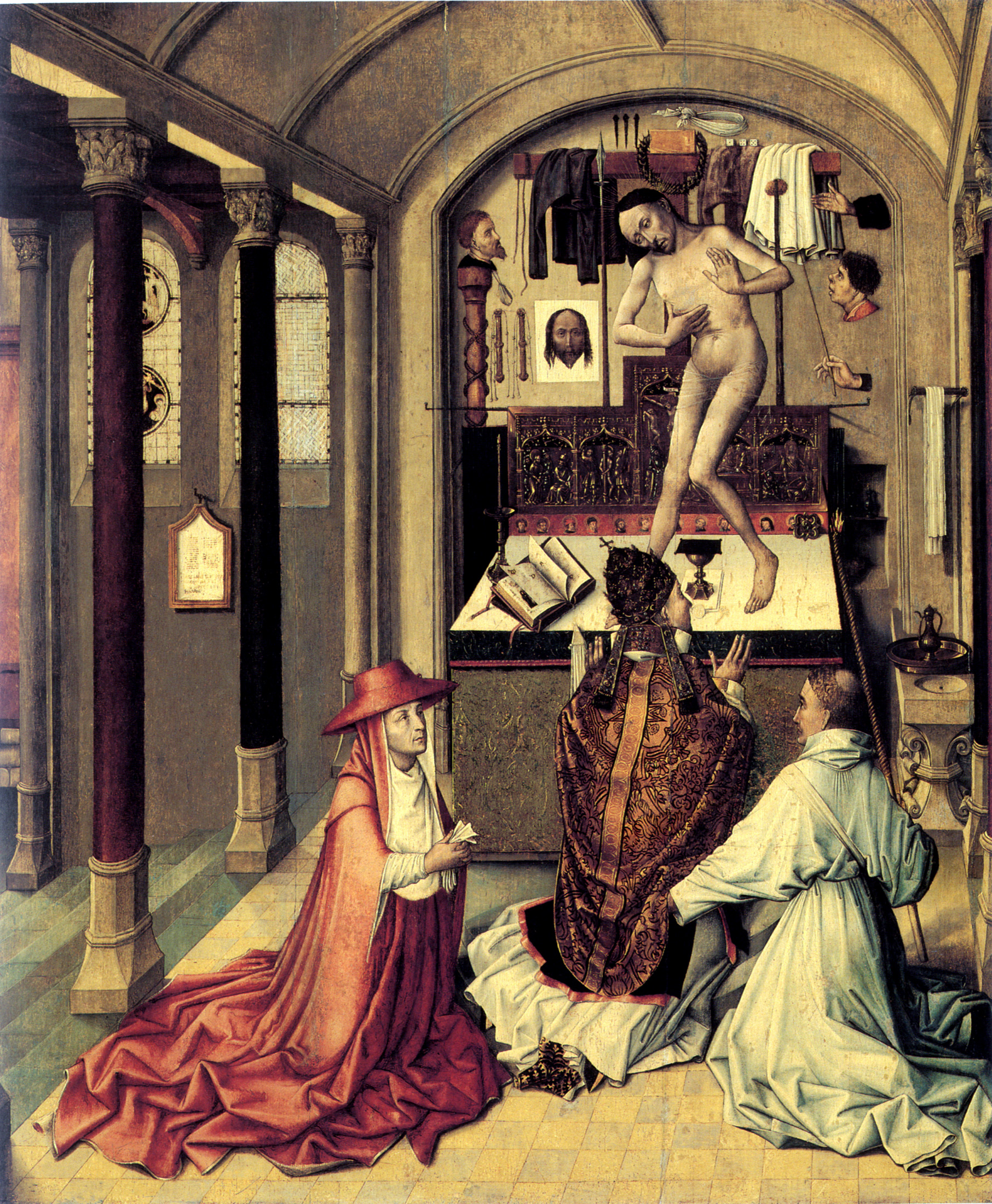
The Mass of St. Gregory, by Robert Campin, 15th century

The late medieval subject of the Mass of St. Gregory shows a version of a 7th-century story that was elaborated in later hagiography. Gregory is shown saying Mass when Christ as the Man of Sorrows appears on the altar. The subject was most common in the 15th and 16th centuries, and reflected growing emphasis on the Real Presence, and after the Protestant Reformation was an assertion of the doctrine against Protestant theology.

== Memorials ==
=== Relics ===
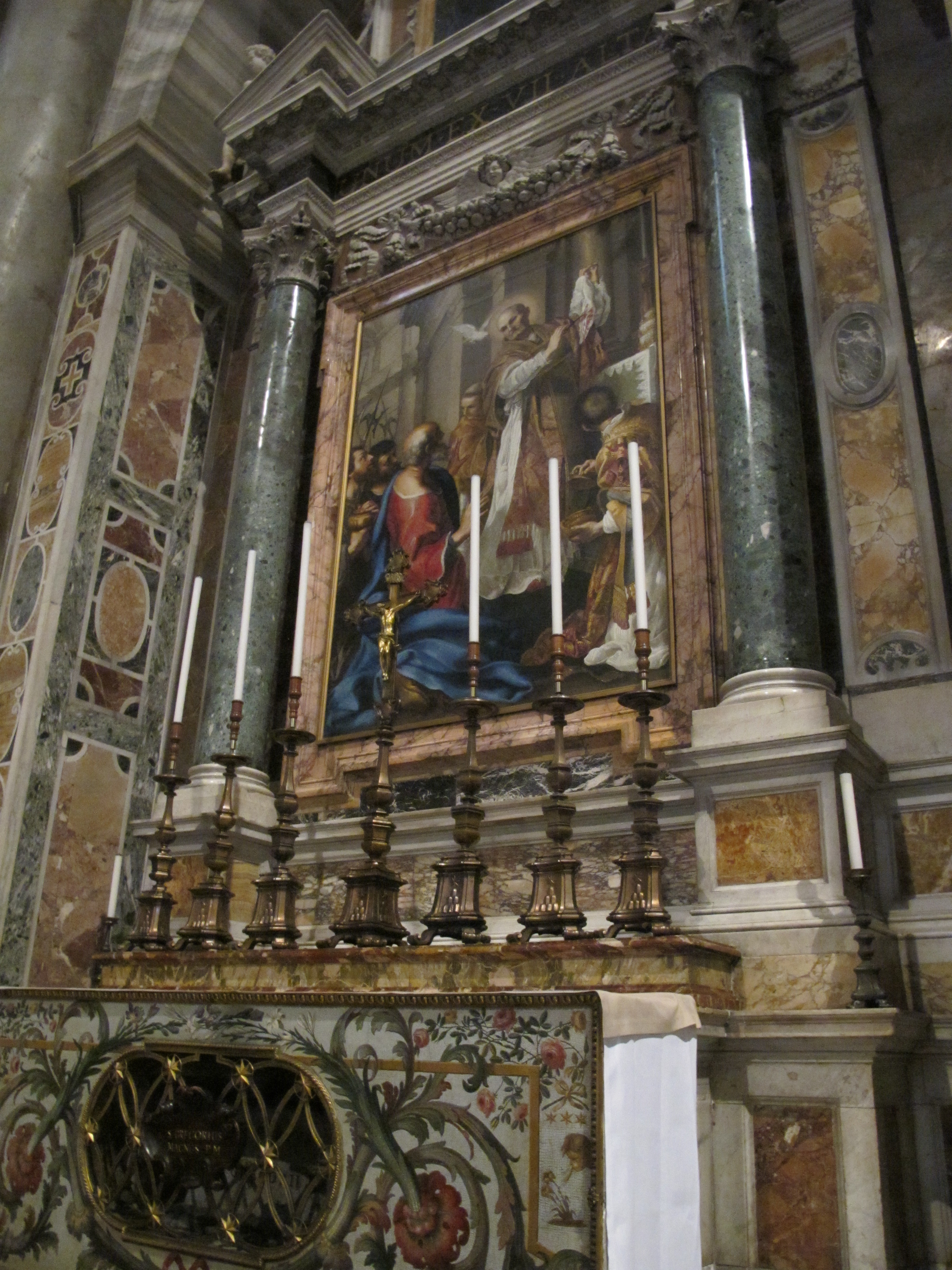
Altar of Saint Gregory in St. Peter's Basilica, which contains the remains of Pope Gregory

The relics of Saint Gregory are enshrined in St. Peter's Basilica in Rome.

=== Lives ===
In Britain, appreciation for Gregory remained strong even after his death, with him being called Gregorius noster ("our Gregory") by the British. It was in Britain, at a monastery in Whitby, that the first full-length life of Gregory was written, c. 713, by a monk or, possibly, a nun. Appreciation of Gregory in Rome and Italy itself, however, did not come until later. The first vita of Gregory written in Italy was not produced until Johannes Hymonides (aka John the Deacon) in the 9th century.

=== Monuments ===
The namesake church of San Gregorio al Celio (largely rebuilt from the original edifices during the 17th and 18th centuries) remembers his work. One of the three oratories annexed, the oratory of Saint Silvia, is said to lie over the tomb of Gregory's mother.

In England, Gregory (along with Augustine of Canterbury) is revered as the apostle of the land and the source of the nation's conversion.

=== Throne ===
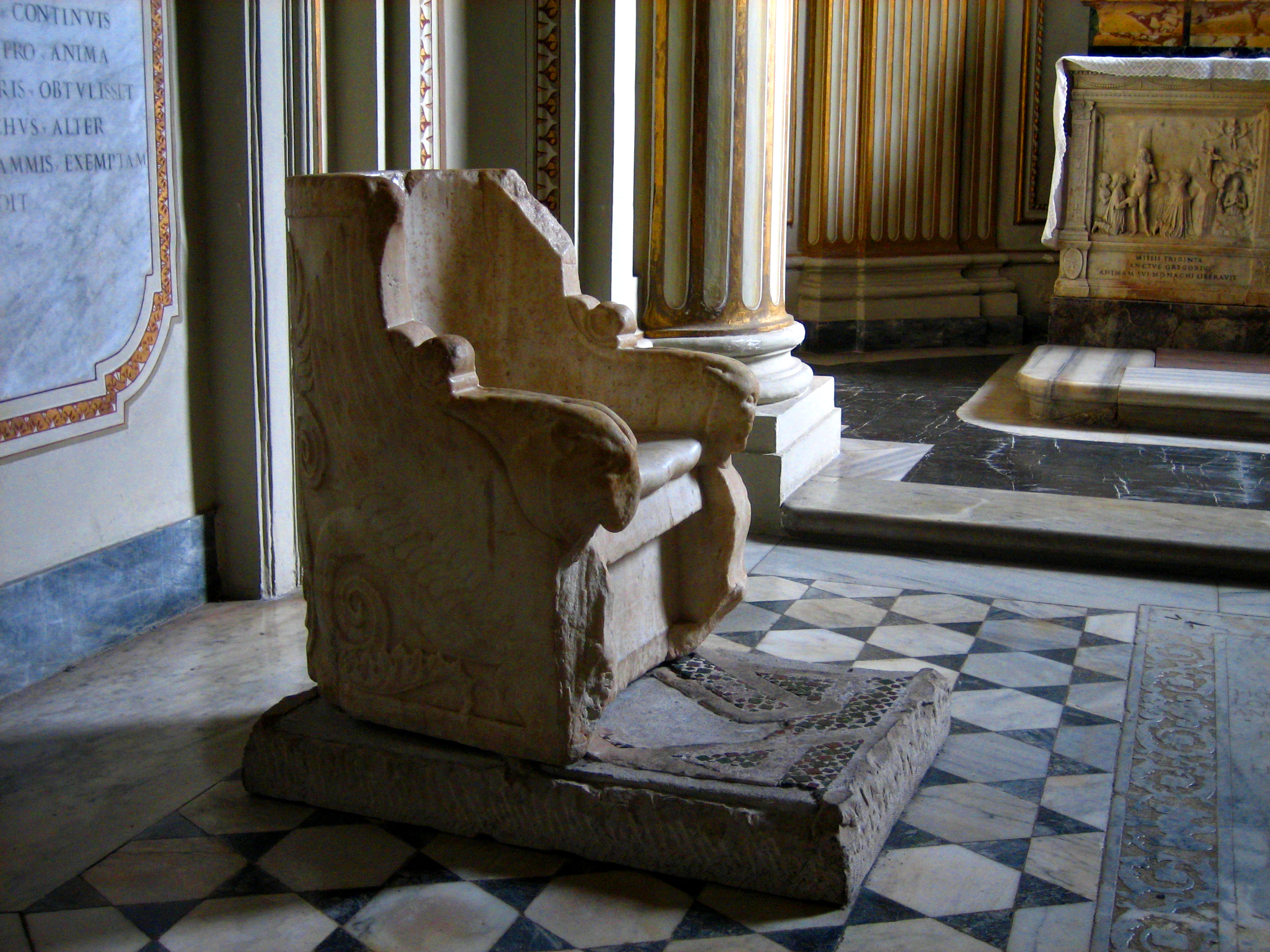
Throne of Pope Gregory the Great in San Gregorio Magno al Celio

An ancient marble chair, which is believed to be the chair of Pope Gregory the Great, is kept in the church San Gregorio Magno al Celio in Rome.

=== Music ===
Italian composer Ottorino Respighi composed a piece named St. Gregory the Great (San Gregorio Magno) that features as the fourth and final part of his Church Windows (Vetrate di Chiesa) works, written in 1925.

=== Feast day ===
The current General Roman Calendar, revised in 1969 as instructed by the Second Vatican Council, celebrates Saint Gregory the Great on 3 September. Before that, it assigned his feast day to 12 March, the day of his death in 604. Following the imposition of Pope John XXIII's Code of Rubrics in 1961, celebration of Saint Gregory's feast day was made practically impossible, as John XXIII's reforms forbade the full observance of most feasts during Lent, during which 12 March invariably falls. For this reason, Saint Gregory's feast day was moved to 3 September, the day of his episcopal consecration in 590, as part of the liturgical reforms of Pope Paul VI. The Eastern Orthodox Church and those Eastern Catholic Churches which follow the Byzantine Rite continue to commemorate Saint Gregory on 12 March which is during Great Lent, the only time when the Divine Liturgy of the Presanctified Gifts, which names Saint Gregory as its author, is used.

Other churches also honour Gregory the Great:

- The Lutheran Church–Missouri Synod remember him with a commemoration on 3 September,
- The Evangelical Lutheran Church in America remember him with a commemoration on 12 March,
- The Episcopal Church of the United States honors him on 12 March
- The Anglican Church of Canada remember him with a Memorial on 3 September.
- Gregory the Great is remembered in the Church of England with a Lesser Festival on 3 September.
- The Parish Church in Ta' Kercem Gozo is co-dedicated to Gregory the Great (San Girgor il-Kbir). The feast is celebrated on 12 March or the nearest Sunday.

A traditional procession is held in Żejtun, Malta, in honour of Saint Gregory (San Girgor) on Easter Wednesday, which most often falls in April, the range of possible dates being 25 March to 28 April. The feast day of Saint Gregory also serves as a commemorative day for the former pupils of Downside School, called Old Gregorians. Traditionally, OG ties are worn by all of the society's members on this day.

== Written works ==
- Gregory (n.d.). "Cod. Sang. 211". Homiliae in Ezechielem I-XXII. St. Gallen, Abbey Library. doi:10.5076/e-codices-csg-0211.

=== Modern editions ===
- Homiliae in Hiezechihelem prophetam, ed. Marcus Adriaen, CCSL 142 (Turnhout: Brepols, 1971)
- Dialogorum libri quattuor seu De miraculis patrum italicorum: Grégoire le Grand, Dialogues, ed. Adalbert de Vogüé, 3 vols., Sources crétiennes 251, 260, 265 (Paris, 1978–1980) – also available via the Brepols Library of Latin Texts online database at Library of Latin Texts – online (LLT-O)
- Moralia in Iob, ed. Marcus Adriaen, 3 vols. CCSL 143, 143A, 143B (Turnhout: Brepols, 1979–1985)

=== Translations ===
- The Dialogues of Saint Gregory the Great, trans. Edmund G. Gardner (London & Boston, 1911).
- Pastoral Care, trans. Henry Davis, ACW 11 (Newman Press, 1950).
- The Book of Pastoral Rule, trans. with intro and notes by George E. Demacopoulos (Crestwood, New York: St. Vladimir's Seminary Press, 2007).
- Reading the Gospels with Gregory the Great: Homilies on the Gospels, 21–26, trans. Santha Bhattacharji (Petersham, Massachusetts, 2001) (translations of the 6 Homilies covering Easter Day to the Sunday after Easter).
- The Letters of Gregory the Great, trans. with intro and notes by John R. C. Martyn (Toronto: Pontifical Institute of Mediaeval Studies, 2004). (3 volume translation of the Registrum epistularum.)
- Gregory the Great: On the Song of Songs, CS244 (Collegeville, Minnesota, 2012).

== See also ==
- Category:Documents of Pope Gregory I
- Libellus responsionum
- List of popes
- Pope Saint Gregory I, patron saint archive
- The Holy Sinner, a German novel written by Thomas Mann

Catholic Church titles
Preceded by Pelagius II	Pope; 590–604	Succeeded by Sabinian
