= Trasilla and Emiliana =

Italian saint

Saints Trasilla and Emiliana
- Died: 6th century
- Venerated in: Catholic Church, Eastern Orthodox Church
- Feast: 24 December (Trasilla); 5 January (Emiliana)

Trasilla (also called Tarsila, Tharsilla, Thrasilla) and Emiliana (also called Aemiliana, Emilie, Æmiliana) were aunts of Pope Gregory I and are venerated as virgin saints of the sixth century. They appear in the Roman Martyrology, Trasilla on 24 December, Emiliana on 5 January.

== Life ==
Trasilla and Emiliana were sisters who came from an ancient Roman noble family, the gens Anicia. Their brother, Senator Gordian, was a rich patrician who owned "a magnificent villa on the Caelian Hill and large estates in Sicily", and who became the father of Pope Gregory I. They had another sister, Gordiana (also called Gordia), who was much younger. Their grandfather was Pope Felix III and Pope Agapetus I was probably an ancestor. Their mother, Silvia, was also a saint. Gregory wrote that his father had three sisters, who vowed themselves to God and lived a life of virginity, fasting, and prayer in their father's home on the Clivus Scauri in Rome. Even though they did not live in a monastery, they were consecrated and lived according to a rule. Gordiana eventually left to marry the manager of her estates, although Gregory said that she "went to perdition". According to hagiographer Agnes Dunbar, "[Trasilla] was so constant at her prayers that her knees became hard like those of a camel". Hagiographer Sabine Baring-Gould says that "with great satisfaction", the story was confirmed by Gregory.

Tradition states that "after many years of service", Felix III, appeared to Trasilla, showed her "a throne prepared for her", and ordered her to enter heaven; "seeing Jesus beckoning" and struck with a fever, she died on Christmas Eve. A few days later, Trasilla appeared to Emiliana, inviting her to celebrate Epiphany in heaven; she died the day before, on January 5. Most of what is known about their life, visions, and death are from Gregory, who spoke about them from his 38th homily on the Gospel of Matthew and his Dialogues.

According to tradition, their relics and those of their mother, Silvia, are in the Oratory of Saint Andrew on the Caelian Hill.

== Works cited ==
- Baring-Gould, Sabine (1897). The Lives of the Saints. Vol. 15. London: John C. Nimmo. pp. 272–273.
