= Cena Cypriani =

5th-century Latin prose work

- Coena Cypriani; Feast of Cyprian
- Author(s): Unknown
- Language: Latin
- Date: c. 400 (?)
- Provenance: Northern Italy
- Manuscript(s): 54
- First printed edition: 1564
- Genre: Biblical parody, Symposium
- Subject: A wedding feast

The Cena or Coena Cypriani (i.e. "Feast of Cyprian") is an anonymous prose work written in Latin. Tradition ascribes original authorship to the 3rd-century saint Cyprian, bishop of Carthage, but the text was probably written around 400. There is not a full consensus on this date: according to Arthur Lapôtre, it was written under the rule of the Emperor Julian the Apostate (361–363). It is a late example of a symposium.

== Plot ==
The text tells the story of a banquet held at Cana, where a great king named Johel (i.e. God) invites many biblical figures to attend a wedding. These include different figures from both testaments as well as from Acts of Paul, which is considered an apocryphal text. The prose describes the characters going through the motions of a feast (finding seats, picking dinner clothes, eating, etc.) going through their actions and choices in a listing manner. Each one having some symbolic or representative association to their character. Finally when the guests are about to depart, Johel reports some items have been stolen, this prompts the characters to try and find the culprit. Many are implicated in the crime but only Achan is deemed the thief and the king sentence him to death. Then characters take turns killing and burying him, including Jesus who is described as whipping the wrongdoer. Finally the characters return home.

Interpretations of the intent of the work have often radically diverged: it has been viewed both as a didactic work, albeit an unusual one, and as an example of biblical parody. In Bayless' words, it should be read as an "allegory parodying allegoresis and biblical exegesis".

== Attribution ==
While on linguistic grounds it is no longer asserted that Saint Cyprian is the author, attempts to attribute the work to other authors have not found consensus. One of the first to study the piece carefully was Adolf von Harnack, who argued for it having been written by the poet Cyprianus Gallus on the grounds of its using the Acta Pauli. This view is endorsed by H. Brewer, but opposed by Willy Hass, who argues that Cyprianus and the Cena author made use of different versions of the Bible. Despite this, Hass agrees that on textual evidence the Cena came from Northern Italy. A different attribution has been made by Lapôtre, who claimed the work to be a satire directed toward Julian the Apostate by the poet Bachiarius.

== Popularity ==
The work was very popular in the Middle Ages to the point that it was read during the coronation of the Carolingian Emperor Charles the Bald in 875. Many retellings of the story were written in the Middle Ages, the earliest and best-known of which are in the 9th century by Johannes Hymonides and Rabanus Maurus.

== Surviving manuscripts ==
54 manuscripts of the work survive, the oldest from the 9th century. The work was first printed in 1564 in a collection of the works of Cyprian of Carthage.

== In modern fiction ==
In the novel The Name of the Rose by Umberto Eco (1980), the Cena is an important clue in the solution of a series of murders.
