= San Gregorio Magno al Celio =

Church in Rome

- Church of Saints Andrew and Gregory the Great on the Caelian Hill
- Chiesa dei Santi Andrea e Gregorio al Monte Celio
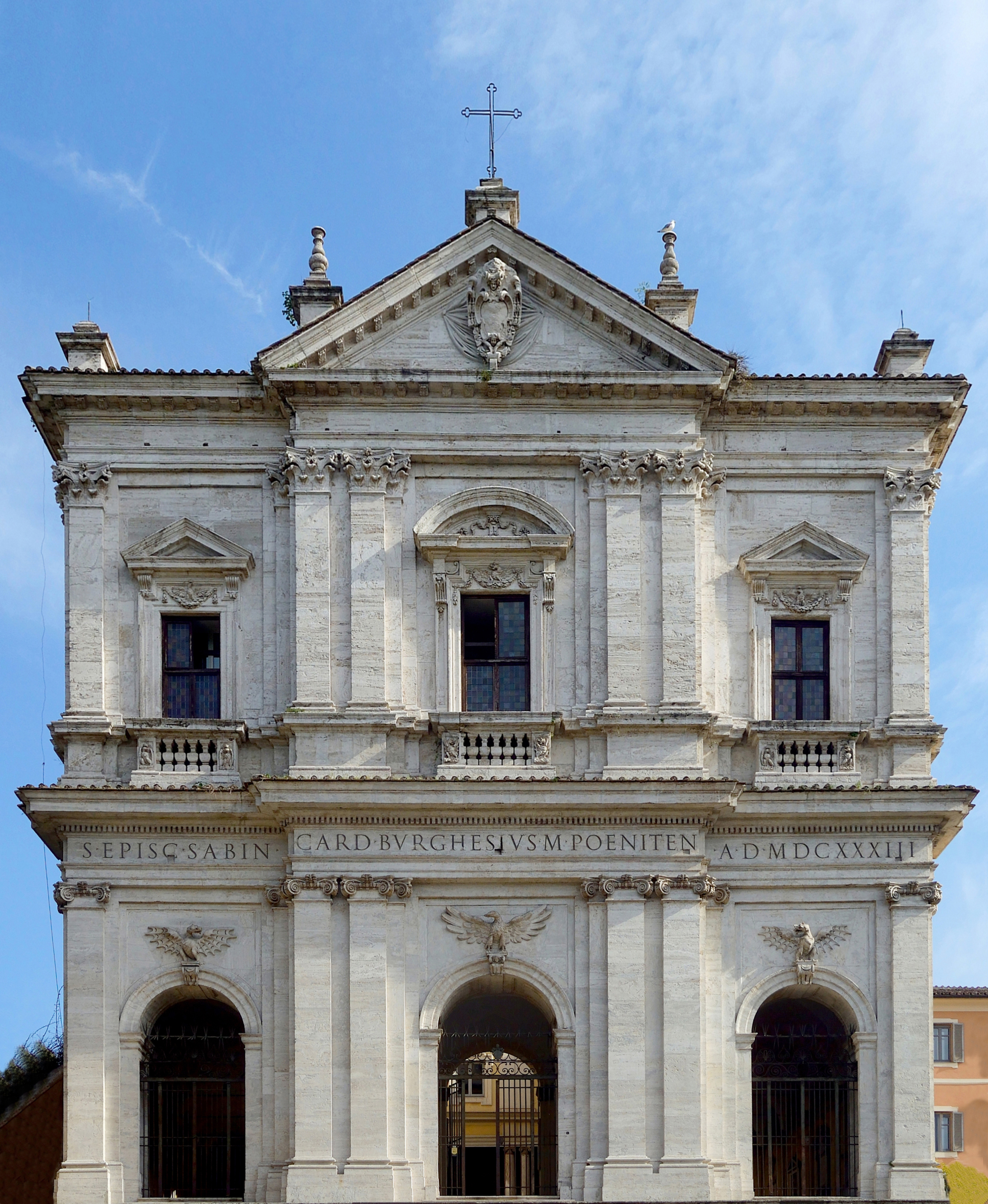
- Stair and external façade of San Gregorio Magno al Celio, by Giovanni Battista Soria, 1629–33
- Click on the map to see marker
- 41°53′08″N 12°29′26″E
- Location: Padri Camaldolesi Piazza di San Gregorio al Celio 1, Rome
- Country: Italy
- Language: Italian
- Denomination: Roman Catholic
- Tradition: Roman Rite
- Religious order: Camaldolese

History
- Status: titular church
- Dedication: Andrew the Apostle and Pope Saint Gregory I the Great

Architecture
- Functional status: titular church
- Architect(s): Giovanni Battista Soria; Francesco Ferrari
- Style: Baroque
- Groundbreaking: 6th century AD
- Completed: 1633

Administration
- Diocese: Rome

San Gregorio Magno al Celio, also known as San Gregorio al Celio or simply San Gregorio, is a Catholic church in Rome, Italy, part of a monastery of the Camaldolese branch of the Benedictine Order. San Gregorio is located on the Caelian Hill, in front of the Palatine. Next to the church is a convent of nuns and a homeless shelter run by the Missionaries of Charity.

== History ==
The church had its beginning as a simple oratory added to a family villa suburbana of Pope Gregory I, who converted the villa into a monastery, c. 575–80, before his election as pope (590). Augustine of Canterbury was prior of the monastery before leading the Gregorian mission to the Anglo-Saxons seven years later at Gregory's urging. The community was dedicated to the Apostle Andrew. It retained its original dedication in early medieval documents, then was normally recorded after 1000 as dedicated to St. Gregory in Clivo Scauri. The term in Clivo Scauri reflected its site along the principal access road, the Clivus Scauri, which ran up the ancient slope (Latin: clivus) that rose from the valley between the Palatine Hill and the Caelian.

The decayed church and the small monastery attached to it on the now-isolated hill passed to the Camaldolese monks in 1573. This Order still occupies the monastery. The archives of the monastery were published by the Camaldolese abbot Gian Benedetto Mittarelli in his monumental history, the Annales Camaldulenses ordini S. Benedicti ab anno 970 ad anno 1770 (published 1755–1773).

The current edifice was rebuilt on the old site to designs by Giovanni Battista Soria in 1629–1633, commissioned by Cardinal Scipione Borghese; work was suspended with his death, and taken up again in 1642. Francesco Ferrari (1725–1734) designed the interior.

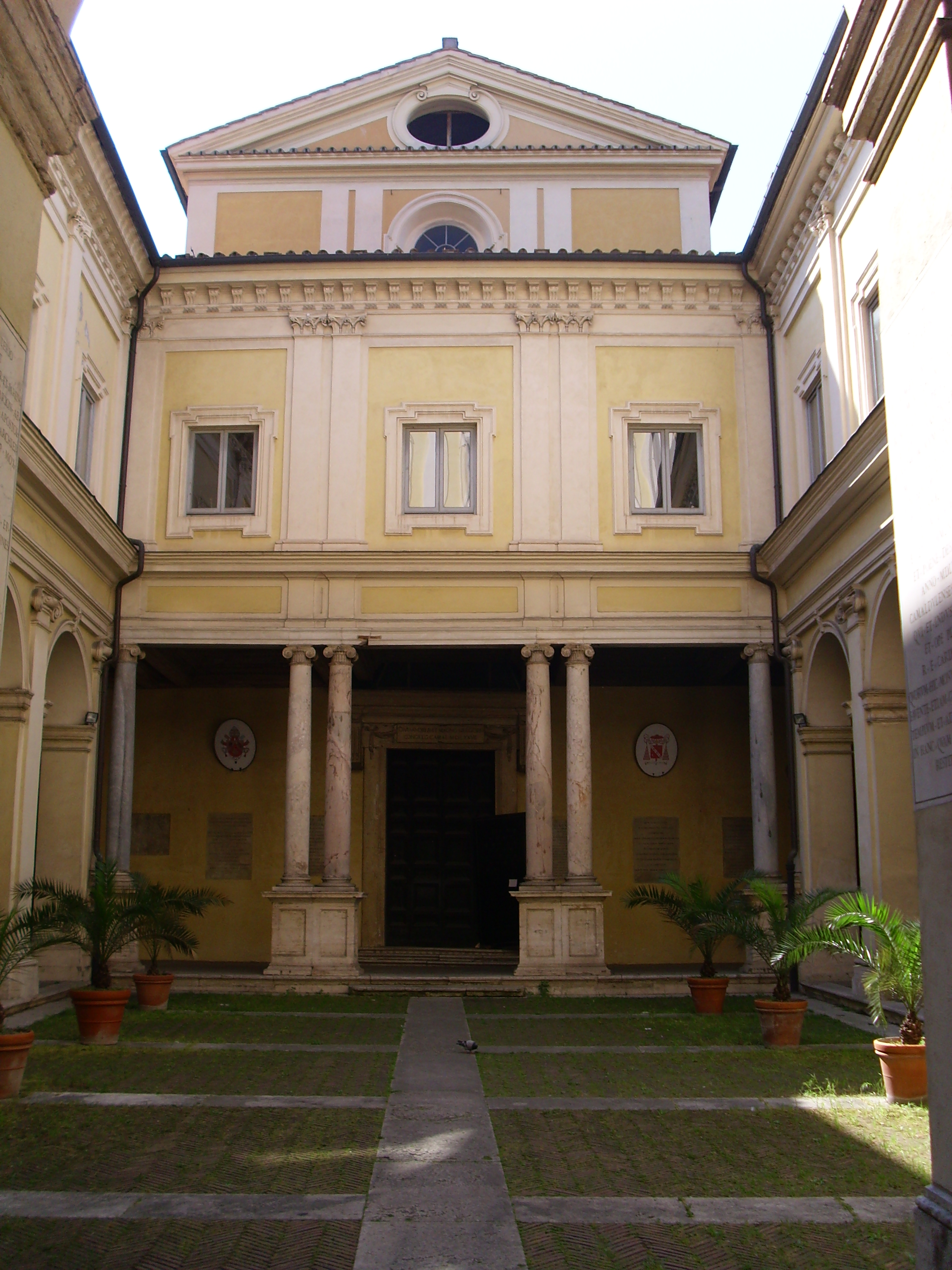
Soria's basilica portico at the rear of the enclosed forecourt

The church is preceded by a wide staircase rising from the via di San Gregorio, the street separating the Caelian hill from the Palatine. The façade, the most prominent and artistically successful work of Giovanni Battista Soria (1629–33), resembles in its style and material (travertine), that of San Luigi dei Francesi; it is not the façade of the church however, but instead leads into a forecourt or peristyle, at the rear of which the church itself can be reached through a portico (illustration, left) that contains some tombs: these once included that of the famous courtesan Imperia, lover of the rich banker Agostino Chigi (1511), but later it was adapted to serve as the tomb of a 17th-century prelate. A Latin inscription commemorating Sir Edward Carne, the ambassador of Queen Mary I of England and a noted scholar of ancient Greek language and culture, can be made out.

The marble cathedra associated with Gregory the Great is preserved in the stanza di S. Gregorio in the church; a shrewd and accurate reconstruction of its ancient appearance was illustrated as Gregory's throne by Raphael in the Disputa. The lion-griffin protomes that form its front and appear in Raphael's fresco are continued on the sides in an acanthus scroll. Three more marble thrones of precisely the same model may be seen in the Isabella Stewart Gardner Museum, Boston, in Berlin and in the Acropolis Museum. Gisela Richter has suggested that all are replicas of a lost, late Hellenistic original; none of the replicas has preserved the separately-carved base that would have continued the lions' legs, very much as Raphael surmised.

The church follows the typical basilican plan, a nave divided from two lateral aisles, in this case by sixteen antique columns with pilasters. Other antique columns have been reused: four support the portico on the left of the nave that leads into the former Benedictine burial ground, planted with ancient cypresses, and four more have been reused by Flaminio Ponzio (1607) to support the porch of the central oratory facing into the burial ground on the far side, which is still dedicated to Saint Andrew.

In the 1970s, the Camaldolese monks allowed Mother Teresa to set up a food kitchen for the poor of the city in a building attached to the monastery. It is still maintained by her religious congregation, the Missionaries of Charity.

On 10 March 2012, the 1,000th anniversary of the founding of the Camaldolese, a Vespers service was celebrated at San Gregorio, attended by Anglican and Catholic prelates and jointly led by Pope Benedict XVI and Rowan Williams, then the Archbishop of Canterbury.

== Architecture ==
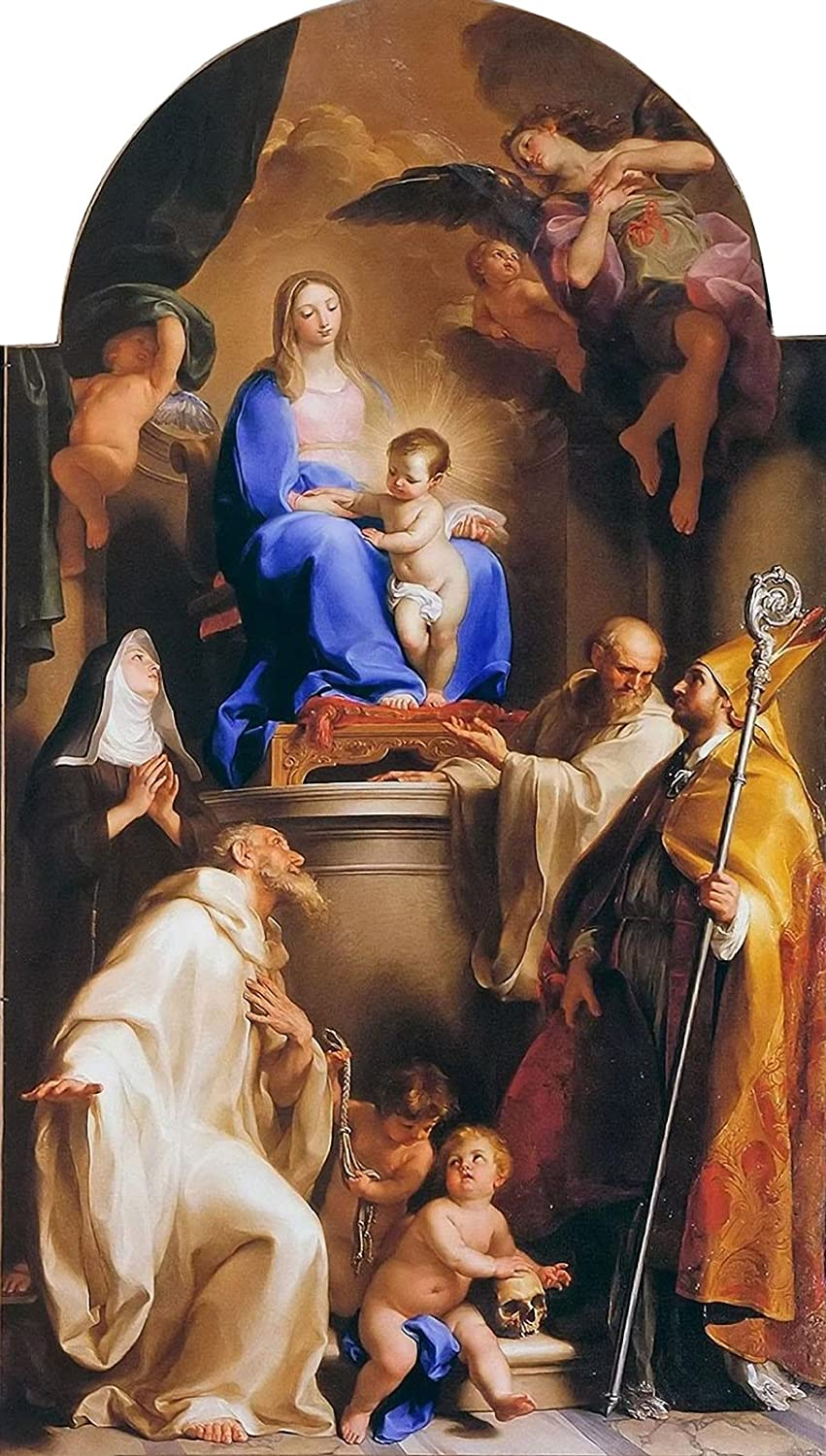
Madonna enthroned with Child and Four Saints of the Gabrielli di Gubbio family, by Pompeo Batoni (1732)

=== Interior decoration ===
The decoration includes stuccoes by Francesco Ferrari (c. 1725), and a Cosmatesque pavement. The vault of the central nave is decorated by a fresco representing the Glory of San Gregorio and San Romualdo and Triumph of Faith over Heresy (1727), by Placido Costanzi. The main altarpiece has a Madonna with Saints Andrew and Gregory (1734) by Antonio Balestra. The second altar on the left has a Madonna on a Throne with Child and four Saints and Blesseds of the Gabrielli family (1732) by Pompeo Batoni. At the end of the nave, the altar of S. Gregorio Magno has three fine reliefs from the end of the 15th century by Luigi Capponi. Also interesting is the Salviati Chapel, designed by Francesco da Volterra and finished by Carlo Maderno in 1600: it includes an ancient fresco which, according to the associated tradition, spoke to St. Gregory, and a marble altar (1469) by Andrea Bregno and pupils. The chapel is used by Rome's Romanian community, which follows the Byzantine rite there.

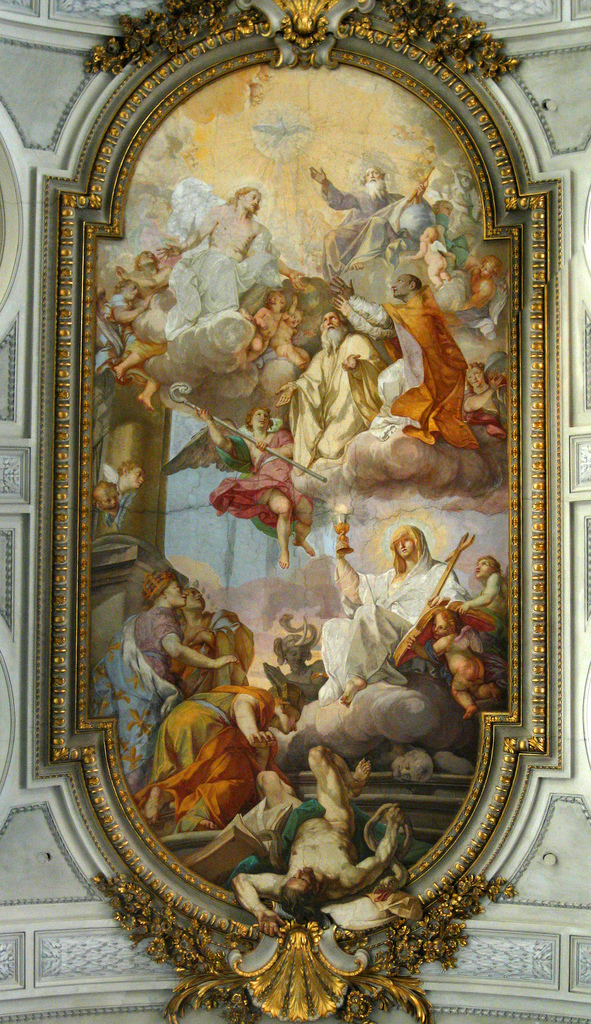
Nave vault fresco of the Glory of San Gregorio and San Romualdo (top) and Triumph of Faith over Heresy (bottom), by Placido Costanzi (1727)

=== Oratories ===
To the left of the church, tightly grouped in the garden, are three oratories commissioned by Cardinal Cesare Baronio at the beginning of the 17th century, as commemorations of Gregory's original monastery.

==== Oratory of Saint Andrew ====
The central oratory has frescoes of the Flagellation of Saint Andrew by Domenichino; a Saint Andrew brought to the temple and Saints Peter and Paul by Reni; a Virgin with Saints Andrew and Gregory by Cristoforo Roncalli, il Pomarancio; and finally S. Silvia e S. Gregorio by Giovanni Lanfranco.

==== Oratory of St. Silvia ====
The oratory to the viewer's right is dedicated to St. Silvia, St. Gregory's mother: it is probably located over her tomb. It was commissioned around 1602 by Cardinal Baronius. The oratory has frescoes of a Concert of Angels by Reni and David and Isaiah by Sisto Badalocchio.

==== Oratory of St. Barbara ====
This oratory, with frescoes (1602) by Antonio Viviani, represents the rebuilding by Cardinal Baronio (1602) of the famous triclinium where St. Gregory hosted a meal every day for a dozen poor men of Rome. At the massive marble table on antique Roman bases, at odds with Gregory's reputation for asceticism, John the Deacon tells that an angel joined the twelve poor men who gathered at the table to partake of Gregory's beneficence. The marble table-supports take the form of addorsed, winged lions whose heads sprout goats' horns.

===== Ancient Roman ruins =====
The grounds of the oratories also include some substructures of the Roman imperial period, that may merely have been tabernae, but one of which exhibits striking features that encourage some experts to think it is an early Christian meeting place and baptismal pool.

== The discovery of an Aphrodite ==
On the grounds of the monastery was discovered the Aphrodite of Menophantos, a Greco-Roman marble Venus of the Capitoline Venus type. The sculpture soon came into the possession of the House of Chigi. The noted art historian Johann Joachim Winckelmann described this sculpture in his History of Ancient Art (published in 1764). It is now on display in the National Roman Museum.

== Cardinal-Priests of Santi Andrea e Gregorio al Monte Celio ==
- Ambrogio Bianchi, O.S.B. (8 July 1839 – 3 March 1856)
- Michele Viale-Prelà (18 September 1856 – 15 May 1860)
- Angelo Quaglia (30 September 1861 – 27 August 1872)
- Henry Edward Manning (31 March 1875 – 14 January 1892)
- Herbert Vaughan (19 January 1893 – 19 June 1903)
- Alessandro Lualdi (18 April 1907 – 12 November 1927)
- Jusztinián György Serédi, O.S.B. (19 December 1927 – 29 March 1945)
- Bernard William Griffin (18 February 1946 – 19 August 1956)
- John Francis O’Hara, C.S.C. (15 December 1958 – 28 August 1960)
- José Humberto Quintero Parra (16 January 1961 – 8 July 1984)
- Edmund Casimir Szoka (28 June 1988 – 20 August 2014)
- Francesco Montenegro (14 February 2015 – present)
