= Bachiarius =

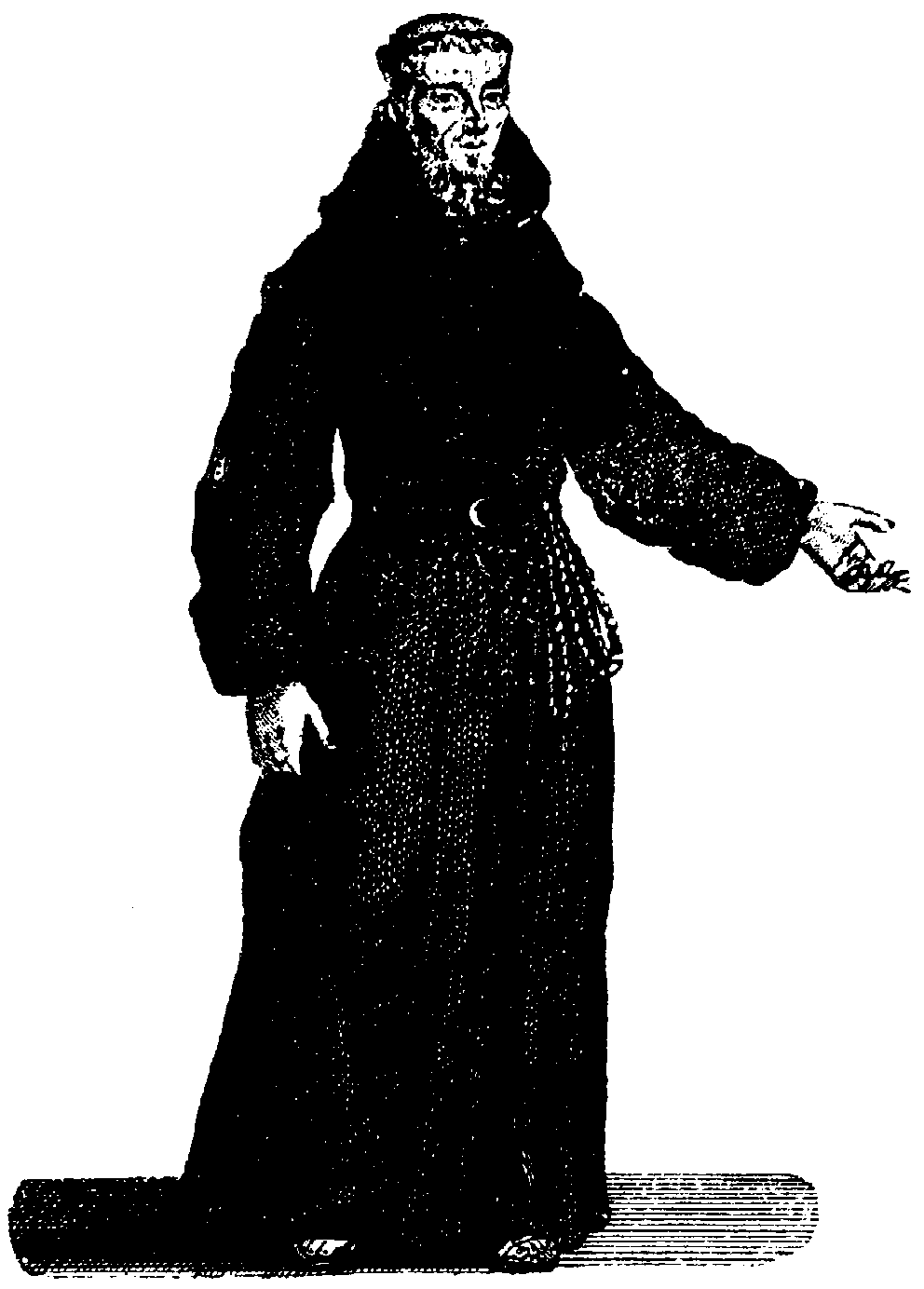
Augustinian monk, Nordic family book

Bachiarius was an early fifth-century Christian writer, known only through his two writings which suggest he was a Galician monk.

== Writings ==
- "Liber de Fide" - an apologetic letter to the Pope.
- "Ad Januariam liber de reparatione lapsi" - an appeal to an abbot on behalf of an incontinent monk.
