= Dialogues (Pope Gregory I) =

Book by Pope Gregory I

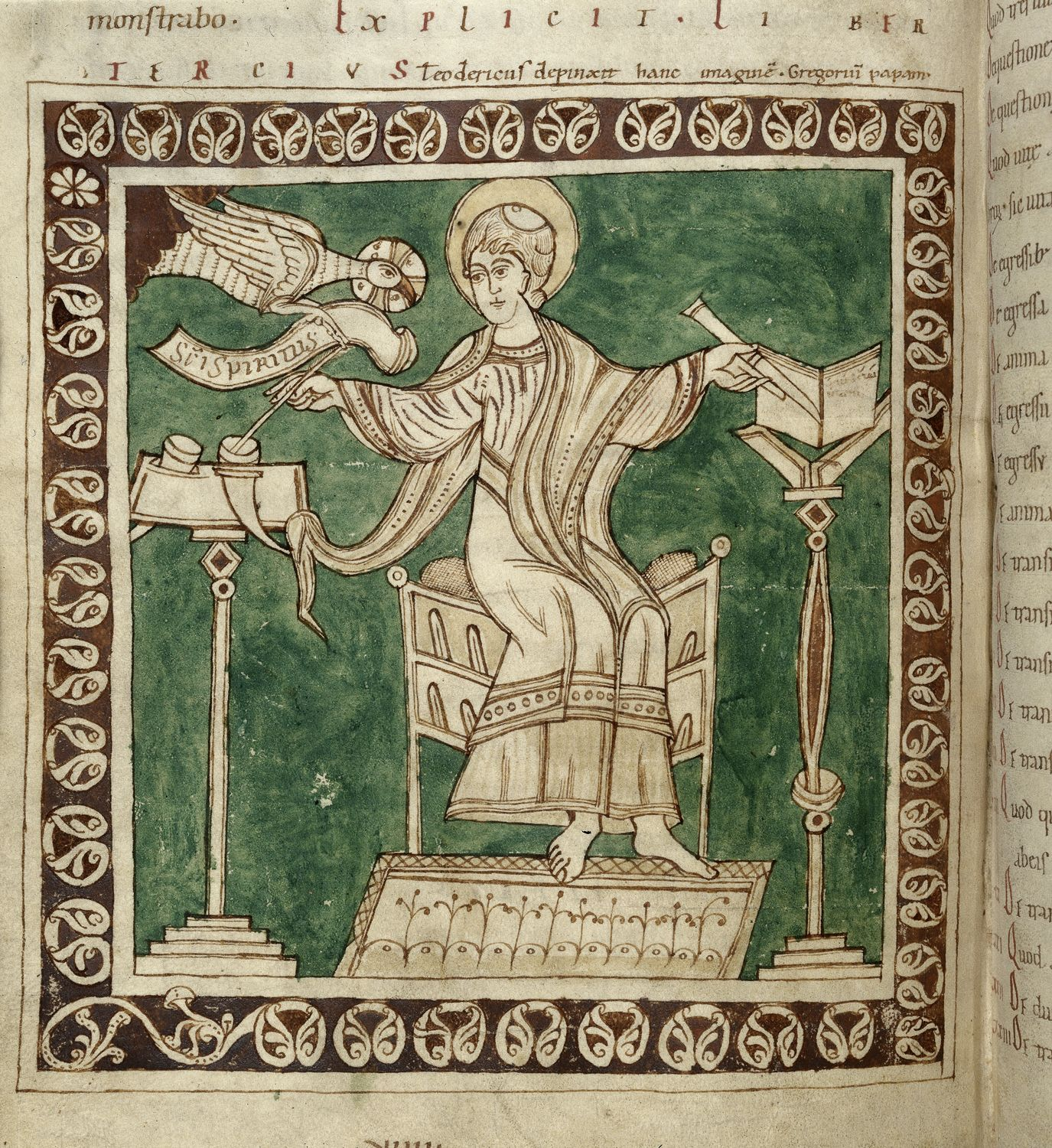
Miniature of Gregory the Great writing, from a 12th-century copy of his Dialogues

The Dialogues (Latin: Dialogi) of Gregory the Great, completed in 593, is a collection of four books.

The first three are of miracles, signs, wonders, and healings done by the holy, mostly men, in Italy.

Notably the second book focuses on the life of Benedict of Nursia (more commonly known as Saint Benedict), and "... is the fullest source for this subject".

"[The] fourth book of the Dialogues is primarily a treatise to prove the existence of invisible realities, mainly the soul and the afterlife."

== Summary ==
Writing in Latin in a time of plague and war, Gregory structured his work as a conversation between himself and Peter, a deacon.

"It is clear from the general preface in Book 1 that St. Gregory's chief reason for writing the Dialogues was to honor the memory of the saints of Italy and to edify and instruct his fellow countrymen. He wanted them to realize that they were living in a land of saints and that great miracles were as numerous among the Fathers(sic) of Italy as they had been among the Fathers of the Desert and elsewhere."

== Reception ==
The Dialogues were the most popular of Gregory's works during the Middle Ages, and in modern times have received more scholarly attention than the rest of his works combined. From this, the author himself is sometimes known as Gregory the Dialogist.

Pope Zachary (r. 741–752) translated the Dialogues into Greek.
