= Johannes Hymonides =

9th-century Italian deacon and writer

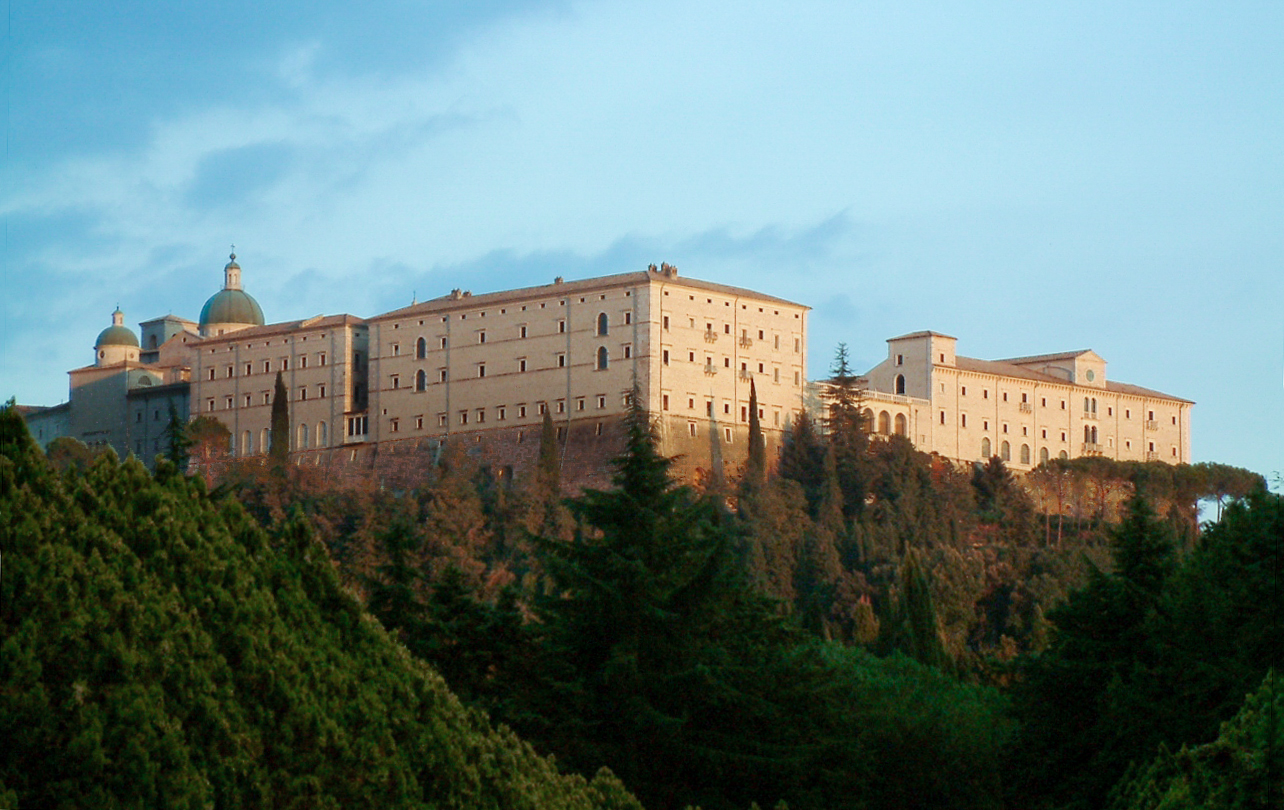
The restored abbey at Monte Cassino

Johannes Hymonides, known as John the Deacon of Rome (d. between 876 and 879), was a deacon of the Roman Church. He wrote a biography of Pope Gregory the Great. He was one of the most culturally significant figures at the papal Curia in the second half of the ninth century.

== Life ==
He was probably Roman and from a wealthy family. In his Vita Gregorii he mentions that he had at the Suburra a rather large estate with a dwelling, and an oratory dedicated to St. John. Anastasius Bibliothecarius says he observed one dedicated to St. Demetrius.

After the death of St. Nicholas I, he was briefly exiled from Rome at the behest of the emperor Louis II, but was recalled by Adrian II. Possessed of considerable learning, he was closely associated with Anastasius, Librarian of the Roman Church (d. 879).

At the instance of Pope John VIII (872–82), John wrote a life of St. Gregory the Great, making use of the works of this pope and above all of extracts made at an earlier date from the pope's letters in the archives of the Roman Church. The work is divided into four books: in the first he gives an account of the life of Gregory up to the time of his pontificate; in the second, of his activities as pope; in the third, of his teachings; and in the fourth, of his progress in perfection. The life was edited by the Maurists. The division into four parts, by the author reflects the order of the material in Gregory's own Regula pastoralis, in which the characteristics of the perfect pastor are outlined. The biography of Gregory sketches the lines of ecclesiastical policy of the pontiff, without indulging in the miraculous and supernatural elements typical of medieval hagiographies, which were introduced in later revisions of the work. For Pope John VIII, John also composed in 876 an adaptation of the Cena Cypriani.

John also intended to write a detailed history of the Church, and at his request the aforesaid Anastasius compiled a history in three parts (tripartita) from Greek sources for the use of John, whose purpose, however, was never executed. On the invitation of Bishop Gaudericus of Velletri (867–79), he undertook to re-edit the Gesta Clementis, a life of Pope Clement I (died about end of the 1st century), but did not live to finish the work, which Gaudericus undertook to complete, though it never appeared in full.

A letter from a certain Johannes Diaconus to Senarius, "vir illustris", treats of the ceremonies of baptism; it is not, however, the work of the John treated here, but of an older deacon of this name. The short commentary on the Heptateuch based on patristic sources in Bibliothèque Nationale manuscript Lat. 12309 is also no longer attributed to John.
