= Regionarius =

Regionarius, plural Regionarii, is the title given in later Antiquity and the early Middle Ages to those clerics and officials of the Church of Rome who were attached neither to the Papal Palace or patriarchium, nor to the titular churches of Rome, but to whom one of the city regions, or wards, was assigned as their official district.

For internal administration, the city of Rome was divided by the Emperor Augustus into fourteen regions. An ecclesiastical division into seven regions developed from the fourth century, evidently in connection with the seven Roman deacons, that gradually replaced the earlier civil divisions. Many branches of the ecclesiastical administration were arranged in accordance with the seven regions — especially the care of the poor, the maintenance of the churches, and whatever else pertained primarily to the office of the deacons, one of whom was appointed over each of the seven regions (diaconus regionarius).

The deacons were assisted by seven subdeacons, each a subdeaconus regionarius. Notaries and defensores employed in the administration of the regions were also known as notarii regionarii and defensores regionarii. There is also occasional mention of acolyti regionarii. Little is known about all their functions, as in general concerning the ecclesiastical administration in ancient Rome, in as far as it affected the regions.

== Sources ==
- Herbermann, Charles, ed. (1913). "Regionarii". Catholic Encyclopedia. New York: Robert Appleton Company.
