= Cyprianus Gallus =

5th century Roman poet and writer

Cyprianus Gallus or Cyprian the Gaul (fl. c. 397–430) is the conventional name of the poet who wrote a Late Latin epic versification of the historical books of the Old Testament based on the Old Latin translation, although only his version of the Heptateuch (Heptateuchos) has survived to the present day. He has sometimes been credited with the authorship of two other poems, Carmen de Sodoma and Carmen de Iona, but neither fits his style and language. These have also been attributed to Cyprian of Carthage and Tertullian.

The name "Cyprianus Gallus" was coined by Rudolf Peiper based on the misattribution of the Heptateuchos to Cyprian of Carthage and the actual author's presumed origin in Gaul. The author has also been called "Pseudo-Cyprian".

== Sources ==
- Kriel, D. M. (1991). "Sodoma in fifth century Biblical Epic," Acta classica, 34, 7–20.
- Longpré, André (1972). "Traitement de l'Elision chez le Poete Cyprianus Gallus," Phoenix, 26(1), 63–77.
