= Ashman =

Ashman is an English surname derived from the Middle English personal name "Asheman", and also a byname form of "aescman" meaning "seaman" or "pirate", a compound of the Olde English "aesc" (boat made of) ash, plus "mann", man. It can also be a topographical name for someone who lived near a prominent ash tree. Notable people with the surname include:

- Anastasia M. Ashman (born 1964), American author
- George Allan Ashman (1928–2002), English footballer
- Glen Ashman (1956–2018), a jurist and judge from Georgia, US
- Howard Ashman (1950–1991), American playwright
- James Ashman (1848–1912), American businessman and politician
- Joe Ashman (born 1995), English actor
- John Ashman (1926–2019), English cricketer
- Keith M. Ashman (born 1963), British theoretical astrophysicist
- Kevin Ashman (born 1959), British, World and European quiz champion and television quiz competitor
- Matthew Ashman (1950–1995), English guitarist (Adam and the Ants)
- Peter John Ashman (1935-), Author: "Mr Blackpool - Reginald Dixon, MBE"
- Richard Ashman (1899–1965), South African cricket umpire
- Rod Ashman (born 1954), retired Australian rules footballer
- Ron Ashman (1926–2004), English footballer
- Yuri Ashman (born 1980), Mexican Writer/Painter/Public Figure
