= St Albans Press =

English printing press

The St Albans Press was the third printing press set up in England, in 1479. It was situated in the Abbey Gateway, St Albans, a part of the Benedictine Monastery of St Albans. The name of the printer is unknown, only referred to by Wynkyn de Worde in a reprinting of one of the St Albans books as 'Sometime schoolmaster'. He has sometimes been identified as John Marchall, master of St Albans School; however, a passage written by Worde in 1497 implies that the printer was deceased, and Marchall is known to have lived until 1501. Recent research has produced the name John Haule as a possible candidate for the Schoolmaster Printer. He presented the school with its first printed textbook, the Elegantiolae, which was the first book printed at the press, and he was a printer, probably in St Albans in 1479.

However, the historian Nicholas Orme, in his “Medieval Schools, From Roman Britain to Renaissance England”, states, “Books were also acquired by schools and institutions. One of the earliest known is a Priscian Major [the first sixteen books of Priscian's Latin grammar, the Institutiones grammaticae] given to St Albans school by John Haule, apparently before 1310." Orme was citing the register of the abbots of St Albans: “Item, Johannes Haule praedictis Scolis dedit Priscianum magnum.”

Lotte Hellinga has suggested that “there were several people working successively at the abbey.” Printing was done in St Albans in two distinct phases, probably by two printers or teams of printers. During the first phase, from 1479 to 1481, they printed six books in Latin for grammar school and university students, with a high standard of typesetting and printing. Then there was an interval of five years, after which printing resumed in 1486. During the second phase, they printed two books in English for a more general audience, with a lower standard of technical skill.

One possible candidate for the Schoolmaster Printer is William Waren. In 1480, in a feoffment or property conveyance in Watford, about five miles away, he was called Master William Waryn, schoolmaster. He was identified as William Waren, Master of Grammar and warden of the Grammar School of St Albans in a case in Common Pleas recorded from 1486 to 1489. He was the plaintiff against the Abbot of St Albans for a debt of £36 (equivalent to £34,704 in 2023). William Waren was awarded Master of Grammar at Cambridge in 1468-9. In his will, written in February and proven in March 1489/90, he requests to be buried in the nave of the Abbey church.

There was another printer active in St Albans in the 1530s. In cases in Common Pleas in 1535, he is recorded as Richard Baugh, of St Albans, printer, and as Richard Baugh alias Waters, of St Albans, stationer.

== Works ==
There are eight known printed works which came from the press:

- Elegantiolae, Augustinus Datus (Agostino Dati, 1420–1478), about 1479. This work was a standard school text of the period, printed in very many editions.
- De modis significandi, seu Grammatica speculativa, Thomas de Erfordia, 1480.
- Margarita eloquentiae, sive Rhetorica nova, Laurentius Gulielmus Traversanus de Saona, 1480. The author Lorenzo Guglielmo Traversagni (1425–1503) was a Franciscan and humanist, and this work was a shorter version of his book on rhetoric.
- Quaestiones super Physica Aristotelis, Johannes Canonicus, 1481. The author was writing in the 1320s.
- Exempla Sacrae Scripturae ex utroque Testamento collecta, Nicolaus de Hanapis, 1481. This was a work from the 13th century; the author, a French Dominican, became Latin Patriarch of Jerusalem.
- Scriptum in logica sua, Antonius Andreae, about 1481-82.
- The Chronicles of England, about 1486. This was an enlarged edition of William Caxton's Chronicles, with additions from the Fasciculus temporum of Werner Rolevinck.
- Book of Saint Albans (Book of Hawking, Hunting, and Heraldry), not before 1486.

== Current usage ==
The Press now exists as a holding company, John Insomuch Schoolmaster Printer 1479 Ltd, incorporated 1996, owned by St Albans School.
