= Facetiae =

1470 book of jokes by Poggio Bracciolini

The Facetiae is an anthology of jokes by Poggio Bracciolini (1380–1459), first published in 1470. It was the first printed joke book. The collection, "the most famous jokebook of the Renaissance", is notable for its inclusion of scatological jokes and tales, six of the tales involving flatulation humor and six involving defecation.

== Printing history ==
Early editions of the Facetiae are rare, and they are not yet described in an organized fashion as is common for incunabula. It was, evidently, very popular: an 1894 bibliography lists twenty editions from the fifteenth century, and states that the oldest is printed by Georgius Lauer in Rome and is known as Hain 13179 (a quarto with 110 leaves). The second oldest is called Reichling 1919 (100 leaves). The 100-leaf edition, despite having been described elsewhere as the first printing, is now generally held to be later than the 110-leaf edition, which is traditionally thought to be the editio princeps; both were printed in Rome in 1470/1471. An edition from 1473–1476, Hain 13182, was printed somewhere in Poland. Christophorus Valdarfer in Venice likewise printed an edition (with 76 leaves) in 1470/1471, and Andreas Belfortis in Ferrara printed one dated 1471. According to Lotte Hellinga, the Venice edition by Valdarfer is probably older than Lauer's edition printed in Rome, and most likely served as its exemplar.

There are surviving manuscript copies from the fifteenth century.

== Tales ==
The last tale on farting involves a wife and her husband. The wife, observing a ram copulating with a sheep, asks how the ram chooses his mate, to which the husband answers that the ram chooses the sheep that farts. He confirms to her that humans work the same way, after which she farts, and they have sex; she farts again, with the same result. When she farts a third time, the husband says, "I'm not making love to you again, even if you shit out your soul."
