= Christopher Morris (news presenter) =

English journalist (born 1938)

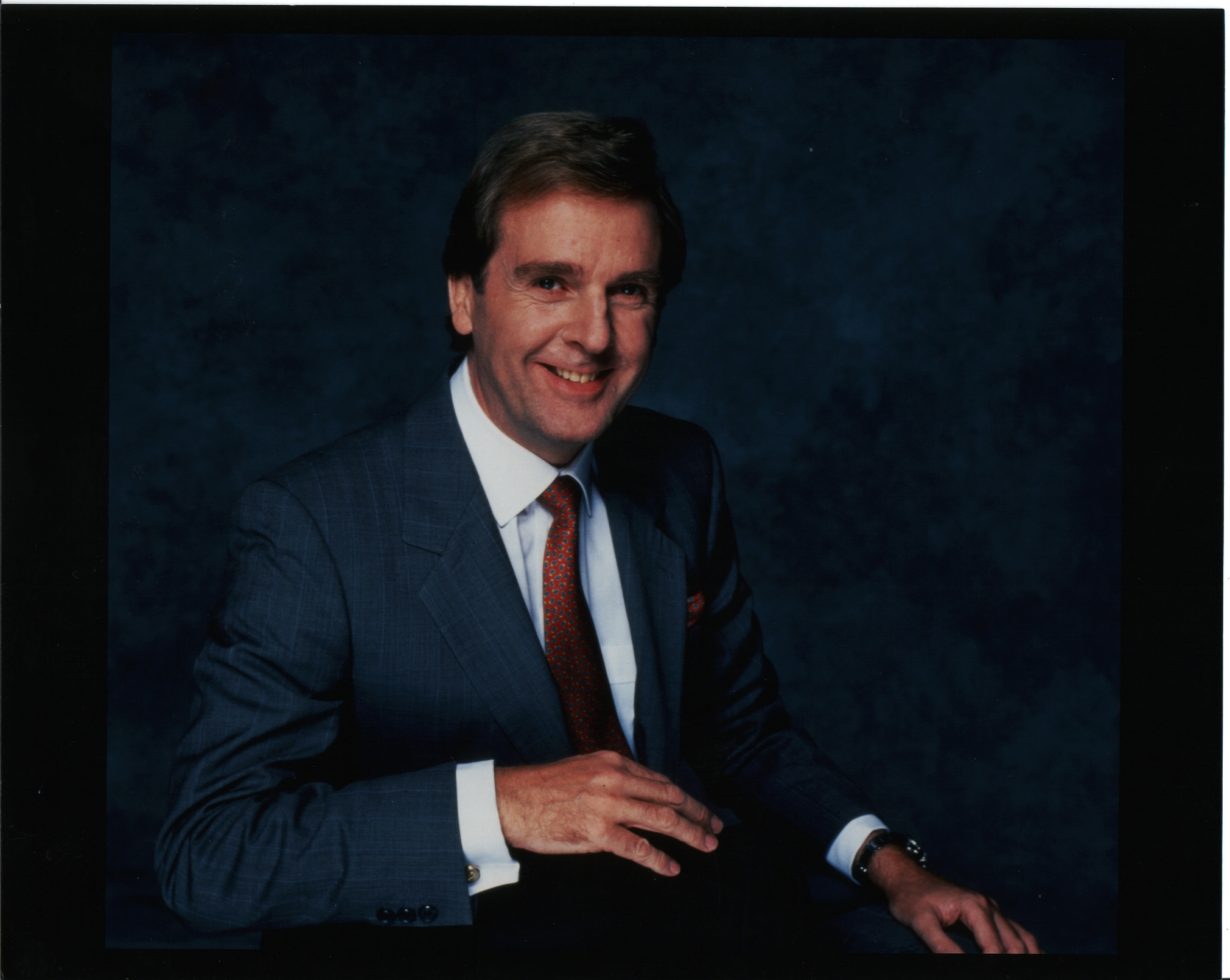
- Christopher Morris at BBC News
- Born: March 28, 1938 (age 88); Luton, Bedfordshire, England, UK
- Occupations: News presenter, journalist, author
- Notable work: Special Correspondent and News Presenter, BBC News Senior News Presenter and Foreign Correspondent for Sky News and author of The Day They Lost The H Bomb

Christopher Morris (born 28 March 1938) is an English news presenter, journalist and author. His most high-profile roles were those of television newsreader and special correspondent for BBC News and senior news presenter and foreign correspondent for Sky News, the first 24-hour satellite television news channel in the United Kingdom launched by British Sky Broadcasting in 1989.

== Early life ==
Christopher Morris was born in Luton, Bedfordshire, and grew up there and in Penrith, Cumberland. As a jazz enthusiast and drummer, he formed the Delta Jazz Band and opened the Delta Jazz Club in Luton where he played alongside famous traditional jazz groups of the 1950s including Ken Colyer, Chris Barber, Cy Laurie and Humphrey Lyttelton. While also playing guitar, he formed a skiffle group within the band and recruited John, Duke of Bedford to play the washboard and tea-chest string bass at a time when he was trying to pay off £4 million in death duties on his stately home, Woburn Abbey in Bedfordshire, England. In his autobiography, A Silver Plated Spoon, the Duke wrote: "I played the washboard for a visiting skiffle group which has made more people regard me as a human being than anything else I have ever done".

Morris was educated at St. Albans School, in Hertfordshire, Britain's oldest public school, before joining the Luton News in Luton as a proof reader at age 15. After an apprenticeship of five years training as a news reporter and also writing regular weekly columns reviewing films, jazz and pop records, he joined the Daily Sketch, where he was the youngest reporter in Fleet Street. In 1962, he left his career in Fleet Street to gamble on setting up a British freelance news agency in Spain, then under the dictatorship of Francisco Franco.

== Career ==
For the next 10 years, based in Madrid, he established his reputation as a foreign correspondent for British national, evening and Sunday newspapers including the Daily Mail and Daily Express, The Evening News and Evening Standard, The Sunday Times, Sunday Mirror and News of the World, and for Independent Television News (ITN) and for BBC News as a television and radio reporter. In 1966, Francisco Franco ordered Morris to be expelled after he broke the story to the world of the worst nuclear accident in America's military history when a US Air Force B-52 on a Strategic Air Command patrol at the height of the Cold War was involved in a mid-air collision with a refuelling aircraft. The B-52 jettisoned four H-bombs as it crashed bringing terror and spreading radioactivity around the Mediterranean village of Palomares when two of the nuclear devices cracked open on impact spilling lethal plutonium over a vast area. Only hours later when the Pentagon in Washington admitted the radioactive contamination on Spain's Mediterranean coast was the expulsion order revoked.

=== Work with BBC and Sky News ===
In 1972, Morris returned to London and joined the BBC staff, soon to be sent back to Spain to report on first, the assassination by the Basque terrorist group ETA of Franco's chosen successor, deputy prime minister admiral Luis Carrero Blanco, and, then later, on Franco's own death and funeral. His first war assignment in Cyprus was to end in disaster when a press convoy strayed into a minefield. The Press Association (PA) newsflash on the morning of 8 August 1974, caused chaos and confusion in the BBC Newsroom. It read: "BBC newsman Paul Morris has been killed in a minefield explosion in Cyprus". In fact, Morris was critically wounded. It was a BBC TV News colleague and sound recordist, Ted Stoddard, who had been killed and six other British and American journalists injured when five anti-personnel mines exploded. Morris came close to death after shrapnel hit him in the chest, collapsing a lung, shattering ribs and paralysing his left arm. After spending months in hospital, and with his arm permanently disabled, he returned to work a year later, and more war assignments for the BBC in the Western Sahara, Chad, Ghana. Uganda, Ethiopia, Sudan, Mozambique, Nicaragua and the Lebanon

Among many major stories he reported for BBC TV News was the world's worst oil tanker spill at the time off the Brittany coast in France when the Amoco Cadiz split in two, and the car bomb explosion at the Houses of Parliament in London that killed Airey Neave the Shadow Northern Ireland Secretary and war hero who was the first British prisoner to escape from Colditz

On 23 February 1981, he was back in Madrid, and by chance the only journalist inside the Cortes, the Spanish parliament, when rebel civil guards burst in during an attempted coup to oust King Juan Carlos. Along with more than 300 Spanish MPs, Morris and his BBC TV crew were held hostage at gunpoint for several hours before being released. His eyewitness account and film of the shoot-out has become an historic record of the day democracy defeated dictatorship in Spain.

Throughout the Falkland Islands conflict Morris was in Buenos Aires, one of only a handful of British journalists allowed into Argentina to report from the enemy side during a war. Immediately after the war ended, he was assigned to Israel to cover the invasion of southern Lebanon. When the BBC decided to switch him to the Palestine Liberation Organisation (PLO) side he was trapped inside West Beirut with the guerrilla forces of Yasser Arafat and under daily shellfire from the Israeli Defense Force (IDF). While in Beirut, Morris broke the news of the massacre of 3,500 Palestinians by Lebanese Phalangist militias in Sabra and Shatila. He managed to smuggle video-recorded evidence of the event to Damascus in neighbouring Syria where the pictures were sent by satellite to London. The pictures caused worldwide protests and almost led to the downfall of the Israeli government. Defence minister Ariel Sharon, later to become Prime Minister, was forced to resign over complicity in the refugee camp attacks.

During the Iran-Iraq war, after being the first journalist to report the fall of the key oilport of Khorramshahr, Ayatollah Khalkhali broadcast on Iranian TV putting a price for Morris' capture and described him as "the serpent of imperialism and international Zionism" Evading capture by Republican Guards, he was at the frontline with the forces of Saddam Hussein to witness their use of chemical and biological weapons.

In the 1991 Gulf War with Sky News, he was the first British television journalist to reach Kuwait City on the day of liberation. He reported on the massacre at the Mutla Ridge when coalition forces intercepted the retreating Iraqi army. Morris also reported from the various frontlines during the civil war in the former Socialist Federal Republic of Yugoslavia, including Srebrenica where 7,500 Muslims were rounded up and shot by the advancing Serb forces led by General Ratko Mladic.

Morris was the only television journalist to accompany Bob Geldof on all his visits to the famine-stricken countries of Africa after Band Aid and Live Aid when his reports for BBC TV News helped to raise £70 million in aid. Other major assignments he covered for the BBC and Sky News was the first television interview with Anthony Blunt after the master spy's exposure by prime minister Margaret Thatcher; Spain's re-opening of the border with the Rock of Gibraltar 13 years after it was closed by Franco; the 1989 earthquake in San Francisco; the fall of the Berlin Wall; the attempted coup in Russia against president Mikhail Gorbachev; the release after 27 years in prison and first face-to-face interview with Nelson Mandela. the assassinations of Indira Gandhi and later her son Rajiv Gandhi; the election of Bill Clinton for his first term as US President; the murder trial of O. J. Simpson; the murder of the Italian fashion designer Gianni Versace shot dead outside his mansion in Miami; and the handover of Hong Kong to China. He has also reported on several royal tours for BBC Television with Queen Elizabeth II and Prince Philip, Duke of Edinburgh in Canada and Australia, with Prince Charles and Prince Harry in Africa, the royal wedding and honeymoon of Prince Charles and Diana, Princess of Wales and on their first ever royal tour together in Australia and New Zealand. He was the Sky News commentator at RAF Northolt for the return of the princess after she was killed in Paris, and later for her funeral at Althorp. While at BBC TV News, Morris was the newsreader on the day Lord Mountbatten was murdered by the IRA. The audience that night of 26 million is still the record for a British TV news bulletin as ITN was on strike.

For almost two years in 1988 he returned abroad, this time as Australia correspondent for the BBC setting up the corporation's first TV news studios in Sydney, as he had done previously 21 years before in Madrid. He was also appointed Australasia correspondent for The Times newspaper. He joined Sky News in 1989 for the channel launch, and for 11 years he was both Senior Foreign Correspondent and one of the main News Anchors presenting over 10,000 live bulletins. He returned as a newsreader with BBC News 24 before launching OmniVision, an independent TV production company based at Pinewood Studios in Buckinghamshire, England. As a producer and director, commissions included a television series, Only Food and Forces filmed in Afghanistan, Oman, Norway, the Falkland Islands and the United Kingdom. He also produced and directed documentaries on one of Britain's most distinguished actors, Sir John Mills: A Century in Films, in his last interview just before he died and another, Kate Winslet: Starmaker to Superstar, about the career of the Oscar-winning actress from the Reading charity theatre group Starmaker to Hollywood fame. Morris is also the author of a best-selling book The Day They Lost The H Bomb about the 1966 US military disaster in Spain. In his last OmniVision documentary, The Curse of America's H Bombs, he re-visited Palomares to assess the continuing radioactive fall-out from the nuclear accident.

== Family ==
Morris is married to Mary (née Frawley), retired Operations Director of Knightsbridge, a care village, nursing home and medical centre in Trim, County Meath, Ireland.

== Awards ==
- Golden Nymph, Monte Carlo International Television Festival, 1983
- Silver Award, International Film and Television Festival of New York, 1983. Refugee Exodus from Nigeria.
- Gulf War medal, 1991. Ministry of Defence accredited war correspondent with Royal Air Force throughout air attack missions, Dhahran, Saudi Arabia
- Liberation of Kuwait medal, Saudi Arabia, 1991. Sky News reports accompanying Saudi forces on day of liberation, Kuwait City
- Kuwait Liberation Medal, Kuwait, 1991
- BAFTA, 1995, Television, Children's Programme, Factual: As Seen On TV

== Works ==
- The Big Catch, published by the Angley Book Company, Maidstone, Kent. 1966
- The Day They Lost The H-Bomb, published by Coward-McCann, Inc. New York. Library of Congress Catalog Card Number : 66–29688
- El Dia Que Perdieron La Bomba, published by Plaza & Janes, S.A. Barcelona. Deposito Legal: B. 20.033 – 1967

== Documentaries ==
=== BBC ===
- Do They Know It's Christmas – Bob Geldof in Africa, BBC-1. 26 December 1985.

=== Omnivision ===
- Only Food and Forces, OmniVision. 6 x 30 minutes TV series. 2002.
- Sir John Mills : A Century in Films, OmniVision. 2005.
- Kate Winslet : Starmaker to Superstar, OmniVision. 2009.
- The Curse of America's H Bombs, OmniVision. 2012.

=== Sky News ===
- Bosnia : The Tragic Divide, Sky News. 31 May 1993.
- Caught Between The Lines, Sky News. 21 June 1993.
- Northern Ireland : The Unholy Divide, Sky News. 15 November 1993.
- South Africa : The Road to Multi-Racial Democracy, Sky News. 1994.
- The Flight of Trevor Jones, Sky News. 1994.
- Rwanda : War and Exodus, Sky News. 1994.
- The Trial of O. J. Simpson, Sky News. 42 x 30 minutes TV series. 1995.
- One Man One Vote, Sky News. 28 April 1996.
- From Opium to Opulence, Sky News. 23 June 1997.
- Hong Kong Handover, Sky News. 6 July 1997.
- Elvis 20 Years On, Sky News. 23 August 1997.

== Filmography ==
- This is England '86 (Morris appeared as himself in this movie)
