= Harold S. Williams =

Photograph of the front gateway of the Tor hotel in Kobe following the great flood disaster of 6 July 1938 (Harold S. Williams)

Harold Stannett Williams (1898–1987), OBE, was an Australian who spent most of his adult life in Japan. Born in Hawthorn, Victoria, he studied medicine at the University of Melbourne. At his father's urging he also received Japanese language lessons from a Mr Inagaki, who ran a local laundry business. In 1919, Harold Williams visited Japan on holiday to improve his Japanese, but deferred his return to Australia, as he found an interesting position with a foreign business firm, Findlay Richardson & Co., Ltd.,. From this beginning he went on to pursue a highly successful commercial career in Japan. While on leave in 1935 he visited New Zealand, where he met and married Gertrude Fortune MacDonald, better known as Jean. Together they returned to live in Japan. He died on 15 January 1987, shortly after midnight at his home in Kobe, Japan.

== Military career ==
During the Second World War Harold Williams had a distinguished military career. Jean and their young daughter had returned to Melbourne in December 1940, and with hostilities imminent he followed in August 1941 in a Dutch ship that sailed via Java. He immediately enlisted and served with distinction in Australia, Africa, the Pacific and Burma, attaining the rank of Major. In 1945 he returned to Japan with the Occupation Forces, and was attached to General Douglas MacArthur's headquarters in Tokyo, where his knowledge of the country and its language proved invaluable. In 1949, he resumed his business career, first as Managing Director of A. Cameron and Company, later as Proprietor.

== Library of foreigners' contributions to Japanese life ==
During his more than 60 years in the country Harold Williams built up an extensive library of books, manuscripts, pictures, serials and other materials dealing particularly with foreign settlement in Japan since its opening to the West in the mid-19th century. As he wrote to the National Librarian, Sir Harold White, in 1969: "my purpose has been to gather together as much information as possible bearing upon the contributions made by foreigners to Japanese life and culture, the manner in which they have impinged upon Japanese history, and all matters relating to the Foreign Settlements".

== Writings ==
Williams was also a prolific author of books and articles on Japan. His published monographs include Tales of the Foreign Settlements in Japan (1958), Shades of the Past, or Indiscreet Tales of Japan (1959), and Foreigners in Mikadoland (1963). His wife Jean, an artist, illustrated these titles with appropriate drawings at the ends of chapters. Among his many journal and newspaper articles he contributed a long-running series entitled "Shades of the Past" to the Mainichi Daily News. The first article in this series appeared in 1953 and the final piece was published posthumously on 16 February 1987. In it Williams explains his commitment to careful documentation of the past: "The need for accurate accounts of the happenings in pre-war Japan and especially of the early foreign settlement days had become evident from the amazingly superficial accounts which were then appearing."

One of his 'Shades of the Past' articles concerned the grave of Frank Toovey Lake who was buried on Sanuki Hiroshima in the Seto Inland Sea. Williams made the trip in 1967 and his extensive notes about the grave and life on the island are part of his archive held at the National Library of Australia.

== Harold S. Williams Collection at the National Library of Australia ==
During the late 1960s Williams decided that his growing collection should be placed in a library in Australia for safekeeping and to benefit future research. The then Professor of Japanese at the Australian National University, Sydney Crawcour, who had known Williams for many years, approached the National Librarian, Sir Harold White. The latter wrote to Williams in April 1969 expressing his strong desire for the collection to be associated with "the collections the National Library of Australia is developing so rapidly in relation to Japan and indeed to the greater part of Asia". The following month White visited Harold and Jean Williams at their home at Shioya, Kobe. In June Williams wrote that he had decided to present "his library of books, photographs and associated items as a gift" to the National Library of Australia. He also established a trust in perpetuity for the development and maintenance of the collection.

Harold and Jean Williams maintained close links with the National Library of Australia from then on. In March 1972 Ken Myer visited them in Japan on behalf of the National Library Council. Myer reported back to the Council that Harold Williams was "a most interesting and dynamic man completely dedicated to his research work on the activities of foreigners in Japan". This work was honoured when in the Queen's Birthday List of June 1972 Harold Williams was appointed an Officer of the Order of the British Empire (OBE) for his services to historical research. In December the same year Harold and Jean Williams made their first visit to the National Library. A second visit was made in March 1981.

The bulk of the book component of the collection was sent to the National Library of Australia in 1978. Forty-four cartons containing some 2,000 books with a detailed index by Harold Williams were received. The works on Japan in this consignment were listed by subject on a microfiche catalogue entitled "Japan: Books in the Harold S. Williams Collection", issued by the National Library of Australia in 1981. A further 23 cartons containing some books, but consisting mainly of manuscripts, photographs, albums and research files arrived in Canberra in 1982. The books in this second consignment were listed in a printed supplement to the microfiche catalogue. More recently all publications in the collection have been catalogued on the Library's online catalogue, making them readily accessible to scholars and readers across Australia.

In line with the donor's wishes all the books in the Harold S.Williams Collection have been kept together in the Asian Collections area. The manuscripts, photographs and other items are housed in the Manuscripts Section. A Guide to the Papers of Harold S. Williams in the National Library of Australia, compiled by Corinne Collins, was published by the Library in 2000 and is available on request.

The maintenance and development of the collection was greatly assisted by Jean Williams. She donated her own considerable collection of Japanese and Chinese art books, and through her generosity the National Library was able to purchase further publications, in both English and Japanese, about western contact with and settlement in Japan for addition to the Harold S.Williams Collection. After her husband's death she also published a two-volume collection of their writings, West Meets East: The Foreign Experience of Japan (1992). With her support it has been possible to reproduce on colour microfiche the 35 albums of pictures from the collection. Harold Williams referred to these albums as "my superb collection of photographs (all unusual, many rare) of things Japanese". They range in subject matter from the killing of two British officers, about which Harold Williams wrote with Hiroshi Naito in The Kamakura Murders of 1864 (1971), to more peaceful scenes of the foreign communities in Kobe, Nagasaki and Yokohama.

In 1989, Jean Williams was interviewed on tape as part of the National Library's extensive oral history program for recording the lives of prominent Australians. In her later years she lived in Queensland, where she died in 1999.
