= Frank Toovey Lake =

British Navy midshipman (1849–1868)

Frank Toovey Lake (1849–1868) died while serving in Japan with the British Royal Navy. After his death at the age of 19, he was interred on the island of Sanuki Hiroshima in the Seto Inland Sea. Since his burial – and until the present day – the islanders have steadfastly maintained the grave. This led to admiration among the late 19th-century British community in Japan including prominent members such as the British ambassador Sir Ernest Satow, and a number of newspaper articles appeared around the world in 1899 recounting the story and praising the conscientiousness of the local people. Since then the grave's story has continued to feature in the world's media, and continues to be celebrated in Japan as a demonstration of the historic relationship between the two countries. Lake's story also involves Richard Henry Brunton and Thomas B Glover as well as the aforementioned Ernest Satow, all of whom had important roles in Japan's modernisation during the Meiji era. In 2018, celebrations to mark the 150 anniversary of his death took place around his grave.

== Early life ==
Copy of Frank Toovey Lake's birth certificate

Frank Toovey Lake was born into a professional family in 1849. His father was a civil engineer involved with the construction of the Grand Junction Canal and his mother's family were mill-owners in Kings Langley, Hertfordshire, England. He was the middle son of three siblings all of whom were raised in Kings Langley. When the three children were still young, their mother died of cholera at the age of 29 in 1854; their father died ten years later of tuberculosis and both were buried in the graveyard of All Saints, Kings Langley.

Frank and his older brother were educated at St Albans School - also known then as King Edward VI Grammar School. Both were boarders, Lake left school at the age of fourteen and entered the Royal Navy as a Naval Cadet, joining HMS Britannia to begin his officer training. In order to gain entry to the Royal Navy he needed to pass an entrance exam taken at the Royal Naval College, Portsmouth. This he took in April 1864 and was awarded a Second Class Cadetship along with 48 First Class entrants and 11 further Second Class entrants. They all joined HMS Britannia. A year later he took a second exam, passed and was able to join a sea-going ship as a midshipman where he continued his training.

== Naval career ==
Lake's naval record shows that the first ship he joined was HMS Argus – at that time stationed in Hong Kong - which he reached after four months sailing from England. Argus was a wooden hulled paddle-sloop, a fighting vessel with six cannon and a complement of 175 and, after sailing from Hong Kong with Lake on board, she spent most of her time in Japanese waters

Eighteen months later in 1867, Lake transferred to HMS Manilla stationed in Shanghai. She remained in Chinese waters for a number of months before sailing east to Japan. (Manilla was originally a merchant vessel, a three-masted, steam powered schooner, bought by the Royal Navy in Shanghai in 1866, and purchased because the Navy required a small vessel that could be used for a variety of duties including acting as a store ship and carrying mail to ships.)

In November 1868, HMS Manilla was assigned duties to help Richard Henry Brunton survey potential sites for the erection of lighthouses around Japan's coastline. Brunton, along with his assistant Arthur W Blundell and a party of Japanese officials, embarked at Yokohama and then sailed south with a list of fourteen sites to visit.

The island of Sanuki Hiroshima was one of the sites on Brunton's list. They reached here on the morning of Sunday 20 December. Prayers were said and then the ‘Engineers Party’ disembarked to start their survey.

== Death ==
At 2.5pm, the Ships Log records ‘Departed this life, Frank Toovey Lake, Navigating Midshipman.’

No explanation was written in the Log or Muster book as to the reason for his death. However, it is known Lake's death was sudden and unexpected as, in his memoirs Schoolmaster to an Empire published many years later, Brunton wrote, "Eventually we reached [Sanuki] Hiroshima. Here an incident occurred which is worth narrating, as showing another, but this time a most pleasing and praiseworthy phase of Japanese character. One of the midshipmen on the Manilla, a lad of nineteen, died quite suddenly while the vessel was at anchor."

(However, in a death notice printed in The London and China Telegraph in March 1869, it says he died after a short illness. This indicates that perhaps his death was the result of cholera, a common and often sudden cause of death among sailors.)

The next day, Lake was buried on Sanuki Hiroshima in the village of Enoura. The ship's log records, ‘9.30 Officers and Ships Company landed to inter the remains of the late Mr Lake, Navigating Midshipman.’

Brunton described the funeral in his memoirs, 'He was buried on the shore of a beautiful bay, the whole ship's crew accompanying the coffin. The officers, fellow countrymen of the dead youth, stood in a group at a respectful distance, while the ceremony was proceeding. When it was over they approached, and the Tokio officer made a sympathetic little speech. He finished it by saying that in Japan it was the custom to present flowers to the dead, but as there were none in the locality, he asked permission to place a headstone at the grave, and explained that he had written to his government asking that orders be given to have the tomb carefully preserved and taken care of by the local authorities. Immediately after the funeral ceremony was over, a very pretty sight was presented by quite a number of aged men and women approaching with shrubs and twigs, which they reverently laid on the grave. These proceedings at Hiroshima considerably enhanced the European's opinion of Japanese character, so far at least as kindliness of disposition is concerned.'

After the funeral party returned to the Manilla at 10.40, a volley of blank cartridges was fired, the anchor weighed and the Manilla sailed towards Nagasaki. (All this noted in HMS Manilla's logbook.)

== Grave ==
The story behind the grave was passed on by the villagers over the years and, eventually a sign was erected next to the grave recounted that story. Written in Japanese, an English translation records, ‘Here lies the body of the British Officer Lake [in Japanese it is written as Re-ki], a surveying officer who died in 1866 when his ship, HMS Sylvia was sailing on the Seto Nai Kai Sea. His ship moored off Hiroshima, the nearest island and they buried his body in a remote place on the western edge of Enoura village. After erecting a cross, they left. Then in 1868 a wealthy villager, called Okara Haju felt pity for the spirit of the officer, gave him a Japanese name Hasegawa Saboro Bei and registered his death at the local temple. He then erected this tombstone in commemoration.’

[These facts were incorrect in terms of date and ship for reasons that will be explained below.]

Brunton recorded in his memoirs that in 1872 he revisited the grave and found it being well tended by the villagers. (At the time, one of his lighthouses was under construction on the nearby island of Nabeshima.)

Captain Henry St John commanded the British survey vessel HMS Sylvia in the late 1860s and through the 1870s. They spent an extensive period in Japanese waters and made several visits to Sanuki Hiroshima. In 1880, St John published an account of his life at sea around China, Japan and Korea, and wrote of visiting Lake's grave...'on and off for years I visited the spot and always found the simple grave thus watched and cared for.'

In 1876, while making his final visit to Sanuki Hiroshima, Captain Henry St John wrote a letter to the Mayor of Hiroshima: 'Sir – I beg to thank you very much for the goodness and kindness of yourself and the inhabitants of Hiroshima shewn in taking care and tending the grave of the English naval officer, who was buried here in 1866. I am sir H C St John.' (This note is available for view in the Seto Inland Sea Folk History Museum near Takamatsu, Kagawa Prefecture.)

This explains the discrepancy with the date of death and ship's name in the sign alongside the grave, (and a discrepancy found in many other accounts until recently: clearly it was assumed that Lake had served with St John and, for reasons unknown, St John had written the wrong date of death).

Jumping forward to 1897, an American sailor Captain George W Conner became aware of the grave. Connor was employed by the shipping company Nippon Yusen Kaisha, and he often sailed through the Inland Sea. He informed Thomas Blake Glover who in turn brought it to the notice of John Carey Hall, the British Consul in Kobe Hall then informed Ernest Satow, the British ambassador in Tokyo, who wrote to Viscount Aoki Shuzo, Minister of Foreign Affairs, of his gratitude that the grave was being tended by the islanders

== The Grave – First newspaper reports ==
In 1899, extensive articles about the grave and the story behind it appeared in English language Japanese newspapers such as the Japan Mail, the Kobe Weekly Chronicle, and the Nagasaki Press before appearing in newspapers worldwide including the London Times and The Sketch in the UK, and the Colonist in New Zealand. One of the stories in the Kobe Weekly Chronicle reported:

'While coming up from Miyajima in the Snowflake, Mr [Alexander Cameron] Sim and Mr [Mark] Baggallay visited Inoura, a village situated on a small island in the Inland Sea named Hiroshima of Kagawa Prefecture (which must not be confused with the well-known Hiroshima near Ujian) where there exists the tomb of a British officer who was buried there more than thirty years ago. On casting anchor at Inoura, which is situated on the shores of a beautiful land-locked bay, an old fisherman in a sampan close by was asked if he knew of a foreigner's grave in the neighbourhood. He replied in the affirmative and at once took Messrs Sim and Baggallay shore and conducted them to the spot which is situated somewhat apart from the Japanese cemetery, and is evidently very carefully tended.'

The Times 7 July

"THE GRAVE OF A BRITISH NAVAL OFFICER IN JAPAN.—Recently a report came to the ears of the British Consul at Hiogo that the grave of a British naval officer existed near a village on the island of Hiroshima, in the Inland Sea of Japan-a place rarely visited by any foreigner-and that, for some reason, it was carefully kept in order by the peasants in the neighbourhood. The Consul accordingly communicated with the Governor of the prefecture in which the island is situated; inquiries were made, and the Governor was able to send to the Consul a history of the lonely grave. The story was appended by the Governor to a formal despatch of his own, and was obviously drawn up by the village headman or some equally humble official, and it is worth giving in full. The Sylvia, the vessel mentioned, was for many years engaged in surveying off the coasts of Japan:--‘In the first year of Meiji, corresponding to A.D. 1868, H.B.M.S. Sylvia was proceeding on a voyage through the Inland Sea when an officer on board, named Lake, fell ill. He was landed on the island of Hiroshima, at the village of Hiroshima, in the district of Naka, province of Sanuki, and prefecture of Kagawa. The Sylvia proceeded along the coast of Hiroshima and cast anchor at Enoura Bay, to await the officer’s recovery. In a few days, however, he died, and Captain St. John buried his remains in ground belonging to the temple of Ikwoji above Enoura shrine, and, having set up a wooden cross to mark the grave, departed. Several years afterwards, when this monument had almost decayed from the effects of wind and rain, frost and snow, Awaburi Tokwan, Superior of Ikwoji Temple, and others said:--"Truly it would be too sad if the grave of our solitary guest from afar, who has become a spirit in a strange land, were suffered to pass out of all knowledge." Thereupon Terawaki Kaemon, head of a village guild, and other sympathisers, such as Oka Ryohaku, set on foot a scheme for the erection of a stone monument, and, the shore folk all with one accord 222 lending their help, the work was finally brought to completion. This was on the 7th day of the eleventh month of the fourth year of Meiji—that is, 1871. Since then nearly 30 winters have passed, during which time the islanders have not neglected to take good care of the tomb. In particular, from the 10th to the 16th day of the seventh month, old style, there are still persons found who every year clean and sweep the grave, and, offering up flowers and incense, mourn for and console the spirit of the dead.’"

== The Grave in 20th Century ==
On 3 and 4 September 1932, two reports of the burial of Lake were printed in the Osaka Asahi Shimbun (Kagawa edition). "One of the articles noted that an elderly woman of 87 was interviewed who said that she had seen the burial and heard a cannon being fired when she was 19 and how frightened she was. She reported that several foreign ships had come to the island; when the crew landed she saw that their weapons had been covered in white cloth and were pointing downwards. They arrived with one Japanese man and she hid in the bushes as they dug the grave and lowered a strange looking coffin into it. There were these huge noises as they dug; several days later another foreign vessel fired a cannon that damaged part of the beach."

To date it has not been possible to definitely identify the name of the vessel that fired the cannon but it is thought to be HMS Icarus.

So far as is known the story then remained dormant until the Australian journalist and writer Harold S Williams undertook a visit to the grave in 1967. (He lived much of his adult life in Kobe and wrote extensively about Japan in books, newspaper articles and research papers).

He found the grave to be: ‘Tidy and showing ample evidence that it is being regularly tended by villagers, with no less care than is given to their own memorials... there are two vases, one on either side of the gravestone, for evergreens which are frequently renewed, and a cactus has been planted on the left-hand side.’ His story of the grave appeared in the Asahi Evening News under the headline ‘Shades of the Past, Islanders Revere Memory of Seaman Who Died There Over 100 years ago.’

A further account of Sanuki Hiroshima with a brief mention of Lake's grave appeared in This is Japan No. 17, 1969 in an article by Rowland G Gould called ‘Lairs of the Forgotten Pirates.’

'The feeling for the sea is even more dramatically evident in the grave of a British naval officer who died on the island while on a survey mission in 1866. On the day I happened by there were flowers and offerings of chocolates on the freshly raked sand before the gravestone that is just outside the Hiroshima Shrine compound. ‘They could not bury him in the shrine compound and make him a Shinto god like Japanese ancestors,’ explained an islander, 'but after a century, nearby villagers spontaneously see to it that the spirit of the Englishman so far from his own ancestors is comforted.'

== The Grave in 21st Century ==
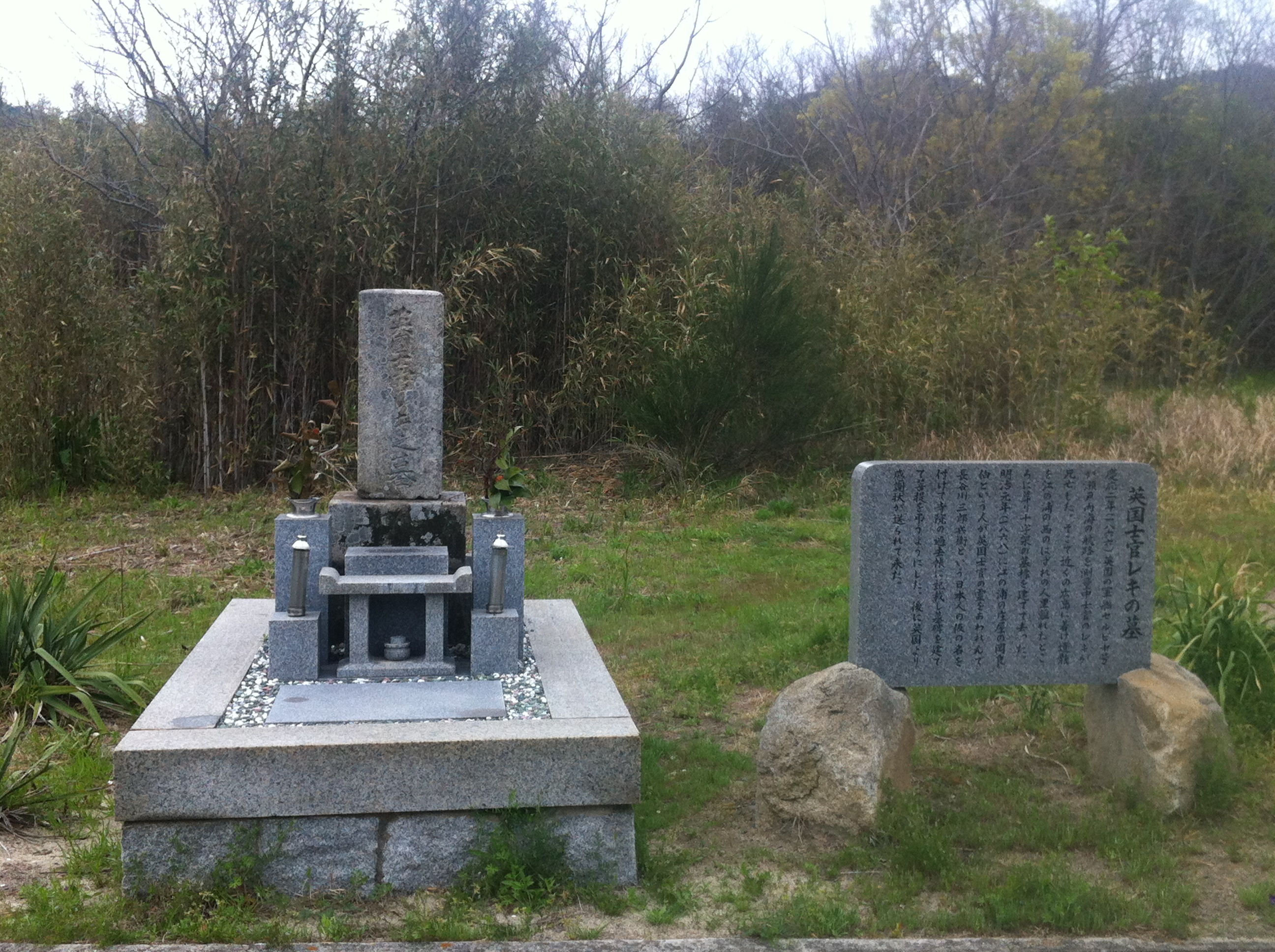
The grave in 2013

In 2009 the grave was rebuilt; in 2011 a wooden sign alongside the grave was replaced by one carved from granite. In 2014, a research paper was written on Lake's story. While held by the British Library and the Bodleian Library, Oxford University, a version of the paper is available online at Google books which provides the base source for much of this article.

== 2018 Celebrations ==
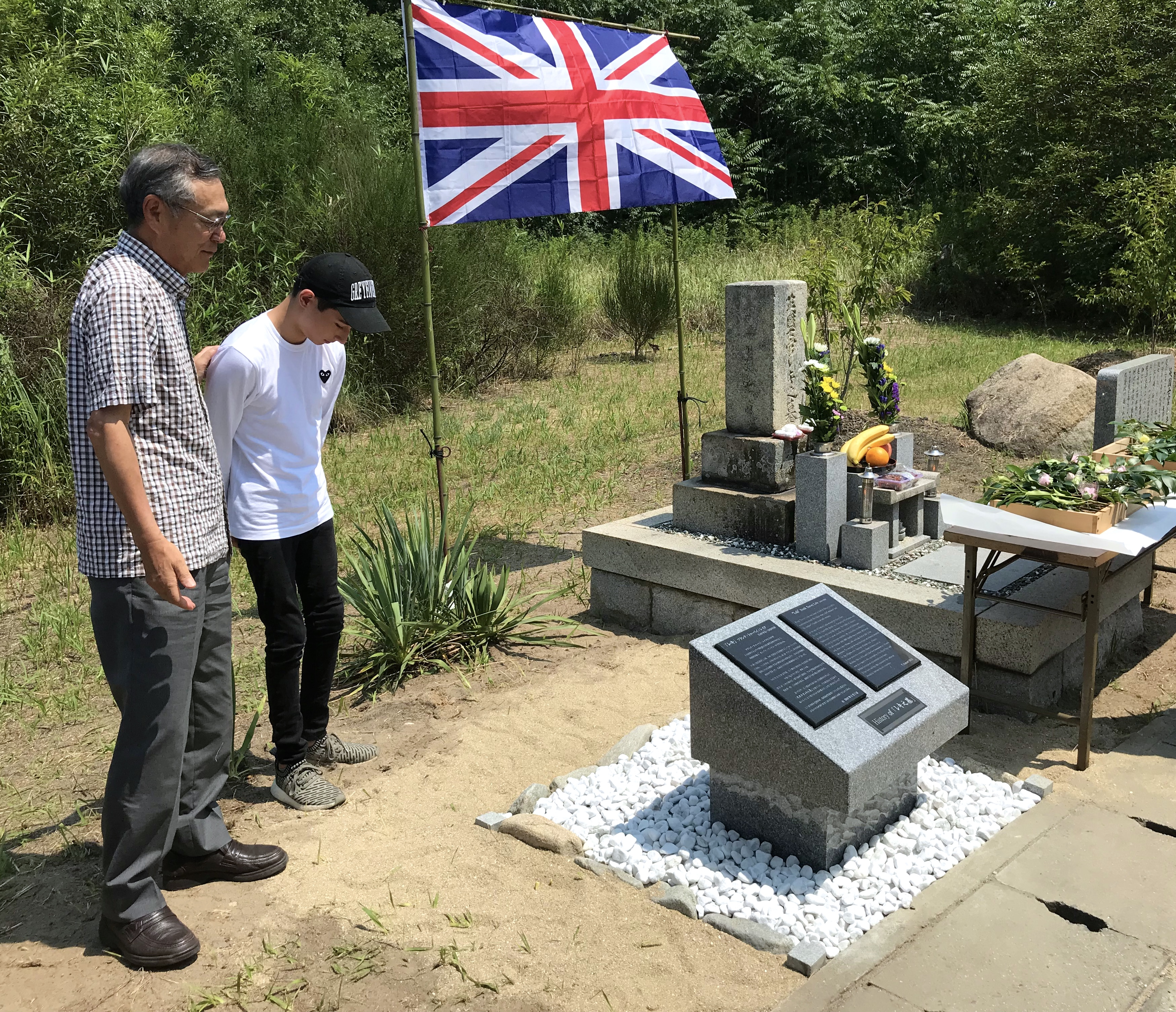
Two participants of the celebration standing behind the new memorial plinth after its unveiling.

In 2018, a celebration was held around the grave to mark the 150 year anniversary of Lake's death. This might seem a minor event but it was important enough for Paul Madden, the British ambassador to Japan to note that the monument that was being unveiled is a symbol of the enduring friendship between Japan and the UK: "The new granite commemorative monument that is being unveiled today is a fitting and handsome tribute both to Midshipman Lake, and to the enduring friendship that exists between Japan and the UK."

The ceremony lasted one morning and in attendance were leaders from the local communities, a descendant of the village headman Okara Haju who had erected the original headstone, and the Mayor of Marugame City. It was also attended by a descendant of the Toovey family, and an Englishman Graham Thomas who lives in Japan and who was responsible for researching the history of the grave and ascertaining the correct facts.

In December 2018, the Japan ambassador to the UK, sent a letter of appreciation and this was followed by a second celebration with members of the Japan Coast Guard present. This was both to commemorate the actual day of Lake's death on 20 December but also to celebrate the first beginnings of the Japanese lighthouse service.
