= Charles Pereira =

British hydrologist

Sir Herbert Charles Pereira FRS (12 May 1913 – 19 December 2004) was a British hydrologist.

He was born in London but spent his early years in Saskatchewan on an Indian Reservation. He was educated there, then at St Albans School and the University of London, where he graduated in mathematics and physics.

After postgraduate research at Rothamsted Experimental Station he gained his PhD in 1940. During the war he served in the Middle East and then in Italy, where he put his skills in hydrology to good use. Thereafter he went to Africa and in 1966 was awarded the Haile Selassie Prize for his research. On returning to England he worked at the East Malling Research Station in Kent, his research being written up in Land Use and Water Resources during a year at the University of Cambridge. In 1973 he was appointed Chief Scientist for the Ministry of Agriculture, Fisheries and Food.

He was elected Fellow of the Royal Society in 1969 and was knighted in 1977. He died on 19 December 2004 of a stroke.
