= Georgius Lauer =

German printer

Georgius Lauer was a German printer who worked in Rome in the late fifteenth century, responsible for important publications by classical authors and renaissance humanists, including editiones principes by Festus, Nonius, Varro, Poggio Bracciolini, and others, as well as patristic writers such as John Chrysostom.

== Publications ==
- Curtius, Historiae Alexandri Magni (c. 1470)
- Festus, De verborum significatu (editio princeps, 1470/1471)
- Lucian (1470)
- Nonius, De compendiosa doctrina (editio princeps, 1470)
- Poggio, Facetiae (1470/1471)
- Varro, De lingua latina (editio princeps, 1471/1472)
- Johannes Chrysostomus, Homiliae super Johannem (F. Griffolini trans.) (1470)
- Johannes Chrysostomus, Sermones morales XXV & Epistola ad Theodorum (C. Personas trans.) (about 1470)
