= Abbey Gateway, St. Albans =

Coordinates: 51°45′04″N 0°20′40″W

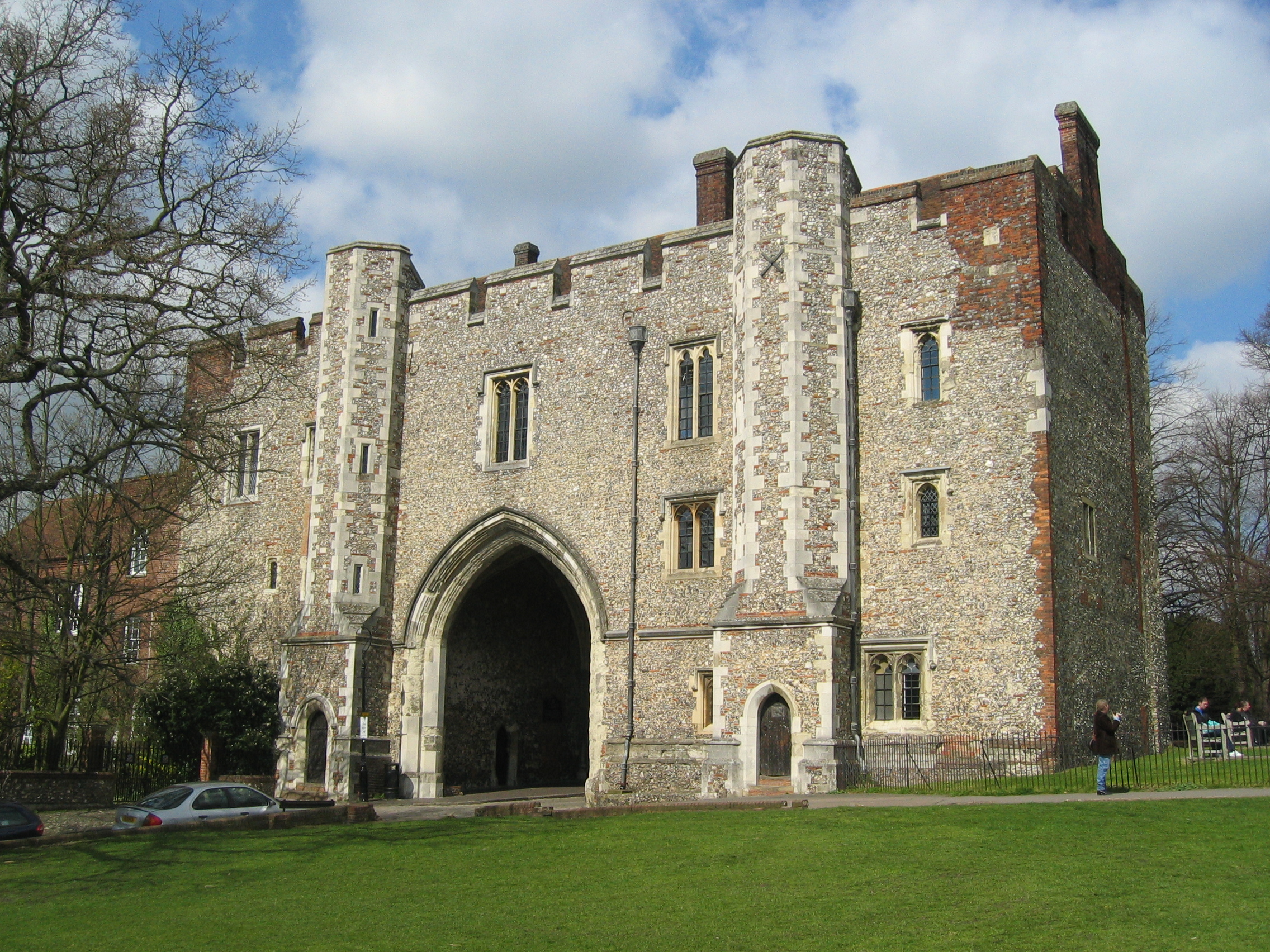
The Abbey Gateway

The Abbey Gateway, St Albans was built in 1365 and is the last remaining building (except for the Abbey itself) of the Benedictine Monastery at St Albans, Hertfordshire.

It was besieged during the Peasants' Revolt in 1381, and was used as a prison following the dissolution of the Abbey in 1539.

It housed the third printing press in England, from 1479.

Since 1871 it has been a part of St Albans School. The gateway marks the end of Romeland and the start of Abbey Mill Lane. Located next to St Albans Abbey and also next to the bishop's Private Residence (Abbey Gate House) the gateway is a good way to spot Abbey Mill Lane.
