= Agostino Dati =

Agostino Dati, also known as Augustinus Datus or Dathus (1420 – 6 April 1478) was a fifteenth-century orator, historian and philosopher best known for his grammatical textbook Elegantiolae. In 1489 Erasmus praised Dati as one of the Italian masters of eloquence.

== Life ==
Born in Siena, Agostino Dati spent most of his life there. He studied under Francesco Filelfo. After teaching in Urbino, he returned to Siena in 1444 and taught rhetoric and theology. In 1457 he was appointed Siena's secretarius. He died 6 April 1478. Much of his work was published posthumously by his son Niccolo.

== The Elegantiolae ==
Isagogicus libellus pro conficiendis epistolis et orationibus was first printed at Ferrara by Andrea Belfortis in 1471. Reprinted over 100 times under various titles between 1470 and 1501, the Elegantiolae has been characterized as "the school book par excellence in the second half of the fifteenth century".
