= St Albans School, Hertfordshire =

Public school in St Albans, Hertfordshire, England

St Albans School

Location
- Abbey Gateway; St Albans, Hertfordshire, AL3 4HB; England; 51.7510°N 0.3445°W

Information
- Type: Public school Private day
- Motto: Non Nobis Nati (Born not for ourselves)
- Religious affiliation: Church of England
- Established: 948
- Founder: Wulsin, Abbot Ulsinus
- Local authority: Hertfordshire
- Department for Education URN: 117647 Tables
- Chair: Neil Osborn
- Headmaster: Joe Silvester
- Second Master: Melody Jones
- Chaplain: The Revd. Dr. C.D. Pines
- Gender: Boys (coeducational sixth form)
- Age: 11 to 18
- Enrolment: 790
- Houses: Hawking; Marsh; Hampson; Renfrew
- Colours: Black, blue, gold and red
- Publication: The Albanian; Versa
- Alumni: Old Albanians (OAs)
- Website: http://www.st-albans.herts.sch.uk/

St Albans School is a public school (traditional English fee-charging day and former boarding school) in the city of St Albans in Hertfordshire. Entry before Sixth Form is for boys only, but the Sixth Form has been co-educational since 1991. From 2026, St Albans School plans to be going fully co-educational. Founded in 948 by Wulsin (Abbot Ulsinus), St Albans School is not only the oldest school in Hertfordshire but also one of the oldest in the world. The school has been called "Britain's oldest public school" by the Daily Mail. Nicholas Carlisle, in 1818, described the school as "of very ancient origin, and of great celebrity" and the Good Schools Guide describes St Albans as a "traditional public school, with a rich history".

Among its famous alumni are Pope Adrian IV, Lord Renfrew, Sir Jack Goody, astrophysicist Stephen Hawking, and Professor Ian Grant.

The current headmaster, Joe Silvester, was appointed in 2024, and was previously headmaster of Wetherby Senior School.

== School arms ==
The school coat of arms is composed of the cross of Saint Alban together with the School motto.

The cross of Saint Alban is a gold saltire (a cross, signifying that Alban was martyred, but diagonal, as he was beheaded, not crucified) on a blue field (or, in heraldic terms, Azure, a saltire Or).

The current school motto is Non nobis nati ("Born not for ourselves"). This dates back to the family of the 12th century Geoffrey de Gorham (Master and subsequently Abbot of St Albans), deriving from Cicero's ("Non nobis solum nati sumus"; "We are not born for ourselves alone"), and was used until the Reformation. It was re-introduced in 1994, thereby stressing the link between the School before and after the dissolution of the monastery in 1539.

Non nobis nati replaced the previous motto Mediocria firma ("The middle road is safest"), used between the 16th and 20th centuries. This was the motto of the Bacon family at Gorhambury (including Sir Nicholas and Sir Francis Bacon). This formed part of the Bacon coat of arms, which for instance can still be seen outside the Verulam Arms public house in nearby Welclose Street and inside St Mary's Church, Redbourn.

== History ==
=== Pre-Reformation history ===
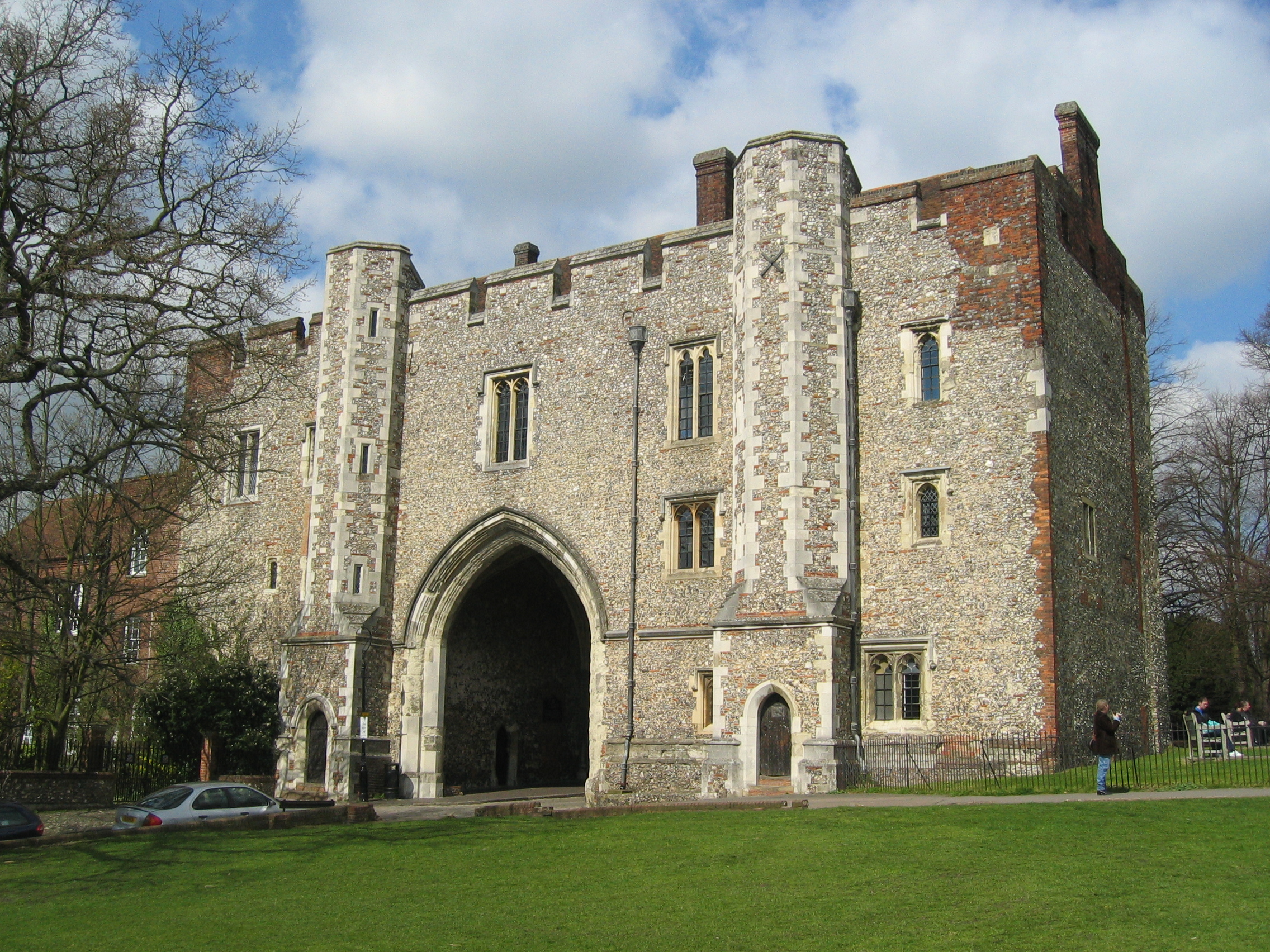
The Abbey Gateway, now home to the school's History and Religious Studies departments.

The school was founded within St Albans Abbey by Abbot Wulsin in 948 and was the first school in the world to accept students not intending to join a religious order, being the first school open to the wider public. By the 12th century, the School had built for itself such a reputation that the famous Norman scholars Geoffrey de Gorham and Alexander Neckam applied for the post of Master. Geoffrey de Gorham was later to become Abbot of St Albans in 1119, and the School then remained under the control of the Abbot until the dissolution of the Abbey in 1539.

On 16 September 1309, the school was given new statutes, including scholarships for poor students. The school and Abbey were sacked in 1381 during the Peasants' Revolt. (The revolt's leader John Ball, was also a former pupil of the school.) By the 15th century, the school was located in buildings in Romeland and inside the Abbey Gateway, which from 1479 housed schoolmaster's press. The St Albans Press continues today, in a dormant form, as "John Insomuch Schoolmaster Printer 1479 Ltd".

=== Post-Reformation history ===
Bourman's School Act 1548
- Act of Parliament
- Parliament of England
- Long title: An Act for the erecting of a School at St. Albons.
- Citation: 2 & 3 Edw. 6. c. 14 Pr. (Note: This is the citation in The Statutes of the Realm.); 2 & 3 Edw. 6. c. 53 Pr. (Note: This is the citation in The Statutes at Large.)
- Territorial extent: England and Wales

Dates
- Royal assent: 14 March 1549
- Commencement: 24 November 1548 (Note: Start of session.)

Status: Current legislation

After the dissolution of the abbey in 1539, Richard Boreman, the last abbot, became Headmaster and the school moved to a chapel near St Peter's church in St Albans after its buildings in Romeland were demolished by Sir Richard Lee for building materials to rebuild Sopwell Priory into a country house. In 1549, to put the school on a firmer foundation, the last abbot was granted the right to maintain a grammar school by a private act of Parliament, Bourman's School Act 1548 (2 & 3 Edw. 6. c. 14 Pr.). Around 1545, the school outgrew its St Peter's church premises and moved again to the Lady Chapel at the east end of the abbey, bought for the huge sum of £100, and it was separated from the rest of the abbey with a wall made of smashed stones from the ancient shrine of St Alban. In 1553 the Crown sold the rest of the abbey church to the town for £400 (the value of the lead on its roof) and became a Church of England parish church for the new Borough of St Albans.

In 1570 Sir Nicholas Bacon, Lord Keeper of the Great Seal and father of Sir Francis Bacon, then living at nearby Gorhambury, gave the school new statutes and re-endowed the school by successfully petitioning Queen Elizabeth I for a wine charter (extended by King James I in 1606). The only other educational institutions with the same privileges to tax the alcohol trade in their localities were the University of Oxford and the University of Cambridge. The income from taxation on wine and beer sales in the St Albans continued to fund the school until 1922, when they were surrendered to the Treasury in return for £1,200 in the Oxford and St Albans Wine Privileges (Abolition) Act 1922. Other benefactors from this period include Sir Richard Platt, Citizen of London, sometime Master of the Worshipful Company of Brewers and later founder of Aldenham School, who 'conveyed to the Mayor and Burgesses, and their Successors for ever' former-abbey land on George Street in St Albans for the benefit of the school, and Charles Hale, whose relative Richard Hale later founded a grammar school in the town of Hertford.

Queen Elizabeth I and Sir Nicholas Bacon also founded the school's library in 1570, which moved from Sumpter Yard in the 19th century to the Abbey Gateway, and then in the 1980s to an impressive converted 19th century neo-Gothic hall, opened by Colin Renfrew, then Master of Jesus College, Cambridge. The library collection now holds over 16,000 volumes and Elizabeth I is still regarded as the 'Benefactor Royal' of the St Albans School Library.

Other significant benefactions to the school include a gift of clay pits near St Albans made in 1582 and a significant amount of land by Charles Woollam, an Old Albanian, in the 19th century, including playing fields at Belmont Hill and St Alban's "Holy Well", which was a site for medieval pilgrimage.

In 1626, King Charles I visited the school in a royal inspection. His visit to St Albans was recorded by a royal crest being built into one of the fireplace surrounds in the Abbey Gateway and this room is still called the "King Charles Room" in honour of his visit.

As a Free School in the 17th Century, the master of St Albans School was supposed to teach certain children in return for his salary, with such fees administered by the school's trustees rather than in return for tuition fees paid by parents. The children taught by the master were selected by their adherence to the specification of the school's donors or founder. In the early 17th century, those from outside the borough of St Albans who attended the school paid 12d; the price for students from within the borough was 4d. In Nicholas Carlisle's 1818 survey of Endowed Grammar Schools, it is noted that St Albans School was particularly unique insofar as it explicitly stated that "poor men's children were to be received before others". This provision was ended however, by virtue of the Master neglecting other students. Indeed, it is noted that in 1635 "many parents, upon hope to benefit their children more than the general, have secretly exceeded the rates aforesaid, being the ancient rates settled at the foundation of the free school . . . for that cause the said schoolmasters have applied themselves in their pains and affections much more to the children of such parents than the general".

After over three centuries in the Lady Chapel, in 1871, due to the restoration of the abbey and the re-instatement of the Lady Chapel, the school moved into the Abbey Gateway (which had been built in 1365 and, following the dissolution, had been used as a prison for 300 years; now a scheduled ancient monument).

Between 1907 and 1976, it was a direct grant grammar school, keeping the name St Albans School for most part not least because of the existence of 2 separate Boys' and Girls' Grammar Schools in St Albans and was generally referred to simply as a Direct Grant School. In the 1960s and 1970s many of the pupils at the school enjoyed a free education, paid for by public funds. From 1980 to 2005, it also offered free places to poor but academically talented pupils under the Assisted Places Scheme. Since the 1970s, the school has also offered a large number of scholarships and bursaries up to 100% of the school's fees, funded from its endowments.

Since the 19th century, there have been many additions to the school site, which now comprises a very interesting architectural mixture of buildings dating from the Roman-era cellar, where the archives are kept under the Abbey Gateway, to modern extensions built in the 1990s. The school also includes the oldest room in the world regularly used as a classroom, the 12th century West Gate Room, which was incorporated from a previous gateway into the current Abbey Gateway in the 1360s. Ptolemy Dean is the current school architect.

The Woollam Playing Fields, a couple of miles away to the north of the city, provides an extensive, modern, outdoor sports facility for the School and the Old Albanian Sports Club. At over 100 acres, it was the largest sporting development in Western Europe until the construction of the Olympic Park in East London for the 2012 games. The site was officially opened in October 2002 by Prince Richard, The Duke of Gloucester. Woollam's was built on part of a 400-acre farm owned by the school, which also contains a field studies centre used by the school's biology department. In 2003, the school opened a new Drama Department building and theatre in Romeland, on the site of the medieval school's building, called the "New Place".

The summer of 2012 saw the completion of a new sports centre on site, with sports hall, swimming pool, climbing wall, fitness suite and dance studio. Another recent development was the acquisition of Aquis Court, an office building adjacent to the school, which provides facilities for the sixth form, with a new common room, cafeteria and classrooms, while the art department also has new facilities.

== Religion and musical education ==
The school still maintains links with St Albans Cathedral, which doubles as the school's chapel. Services are held there every Monday and Friday morning during term time, and special events held there include the annual Founders' Day and two carol services, led by the school choir, who still wear black and blue gowns in the same style as worn by undergraduates at Trinity College, Cambridge and similar to those worn by monks at the Abbey in medieval times. In addition, the school's music staff are usually linked with the Abbey's musical staff. Andrew Parnell, organist and harpsichordist, was assistant master of music at the Abbey as well as being master of music and choirmaster at the school from 1976 to 2001. Simon Lindley also held these posts a few years earlier; John Rutter's 1974 carol Jesus Child bears a dedication "for Simon Lindley and the choir of St Albans School".

== Academic tradition ==
=== Scientific tradition ===
The school also has a long scientific tradition, stretching back to the Norman era, when Alexander Neckam became master of the school. Since the advent of modern science, the school has produced many famous scientists and mathematicians including cognitive scientist Colin Cherry, physicist Ian Grant, cosmologist Stephen Hawking (inspired by Dikran Tahta, a teacher at the school who later worked at the Open University), and mathematician Christopher Budd. In the light of its long scientific heritage, the school was awarded a large sum of money in 2007 by the Wolfson Foundation to rebuild its physics laboratories to university standards.

=== Historical tradition ===
In medieval times, the school and one of its alumni, Matthew Paris, were closely associated with the St Albans school of medieval historiography, and developed one of the first consistent methods of historical writing. More recently; two teachers in the ancient history department published a book on Roman sources in 2010. Some notable historians who are alumni of the school include Colin Renfrew, an archaeological historian and former Disney Professor of Archaeology at the University of Cambridge, Ernest Gellner, an anthropological historian, Professor Malcolm Schofield of St John's College, Cambridge, and more recently Justin Pollard, a TV historian, and Peter Sarris, a specialist on the Byzantine Empire and a fellow of Trinity College, Cambridge.

== The school today ==
St Albans School is predominantly a single-sex school for boys, but has accepted girls into the sixth form since 1991. It is a member of the Headmasters' Conference of leading public schools. In its earlier days it was known as the Free School of St Albans, City of St Alban Grammar School or St Albans Grammar School. It is often (erroneously) referred to as "The Boys' School", "St Albans Boys" and "The Abbey School" (thereby causing confusion with The Abbey C of E Primary School nearby which is almost always referred to as "The Abbey School", and the adjacent but now defunct Abbey National Boys' School, a name which is still borne by a building in nearby Spicer Street).

In 1967 the School acquired what was then a derelict hill farm in the Brecon Beacons.The property, Pen Arthur, was restored and is now a Field Studies Centre. Academic departments use Pen Arthur for field trips and study weekends throughout the year, and it is a base for outdoor activities organised by the Combined Cadet Force and for The Duke of Edinburgh's Award.

In March 2025, it was announced that starting from September 2026, the school would accept both girls and boys in first form (year 7) meaning the school would become fully co-educational.

== Notable alumni ==
Former pupils of the School are known as OAs or 'Old Albanians'.

=== 12th century ===
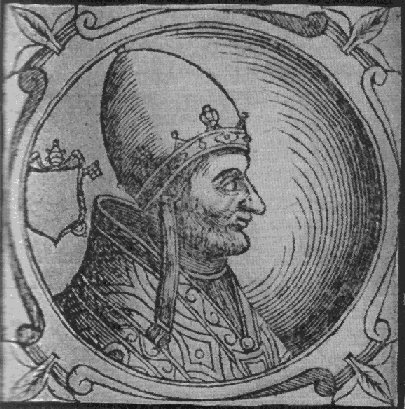
Pope Adrian IV

- Cardinal Boso (d. c. 1181), third English Cardinal
- Nicholas Breakspear (c. 1100–1159), who became Pope Adrian IV (1154–1159), the only English Pope.
- Alexander Neckam (1157–1217), scientist and teacher

=== 13th century ===
- Matthew Paris, monk and historian

=== 14th century ===
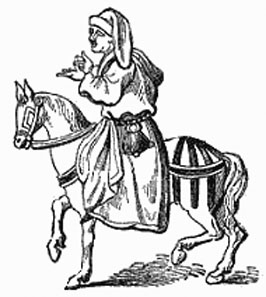
John Ball

- John Ball, Christian radical political thinker and leader of the Peasants' Revolt of 1381
- William Grindcobbe, a leader in St Albans of the Peasants' Revolt of 1381
- Richard of Wallingford (1292–1336) English mathematician who made major contributions to astronomy/astrology and horology
- Richard of Wallingford (late 14th century) a leader in St Albans of the Peasants' Revolt of 1381

=== 15th century ===
- John Whethamstede (or Bostock) (c. 1392–1465), scholar, writer and Abbot of St Albans Abbey

=== 16th century ===
- Walter Curle (1575–1647), Bishop of Winchester
- Robert Wright (1560–1643), first Warden of Wadham College, Oxford and Bishop of Lichfield & Coventry

=== 17th century ===
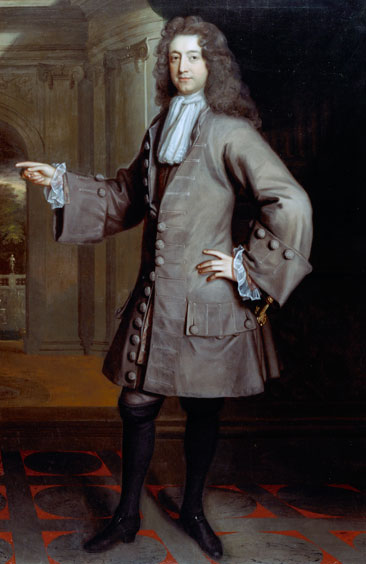
William Cowper, 1st Earl Cowper

- Henry Blount (1602–1682), traveller and writer
- William Cowper, 1st Earl Cowper (c. 1665–1723), Lord Chancellor of Great Britain, grandfather of William Cowper, poet and hymnodist
- William Dobson (1611–1646), painter to Charles I
- Major-General John Hill (?c. 1680–1735), M.P., army officer, politician and courtier
- Francis Pemberton (1624–1697), Lord Chief Justice

=== 18th century ===
- William Domville, Bt (1742–1833), Lord Mayor of London 1813
- Thomas Walsh (1776–1849), Roman Catholic Bishop and Vicar Apostolic, Midlands and London Districts

=== 19th century ===
- Colonel Sir Hildred Carlile, 1st Bt, M.P. (1852–1942), army officer, politician and philanthropist
- Alfred Faulkner (1882–1963), civil servant – Permanent Under-Secretary for Mines
- Henry Montague Grover (1791–1866), writer and theologian
- Coulson Kernahan (1858–1943), essayist, novelist and editor
- Frank Toovey Lake (1849–1868) Naval Officer who was part of Richard Henry Brunton's team who surveyed lighthouse sites around Japan
- Max Pemberton (1863–1950), novelist and editor
- Aubrey George Spencer (1795–1872), first Anglican Bishop of Newfoundland
- Thomas Spencer Wells (1818–1897), surgeon
- William Whitaker, (1836–1925), geologist
- Charles Williams (1886–1945), poet, novelist, publisher and theological writer

=== 20th century ===
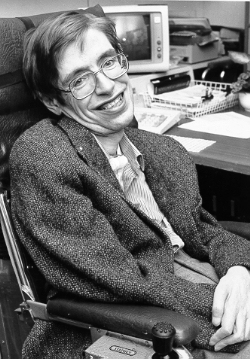
Stephen Hawking

- Rod Argent (b. 1945), musician, founder member of The Zombies
- Keith M. Ashman (b. 1963), theoretical physicist and globular clusters expert
- Paul Atkinson (1946–2004), musician, founder member of The Zombies
- Ian Bell (b. 1962), co-author of Elite
- Tolaji Bola (b. 1999), association footballer
- Christopher Budd (b. 1960), mathematician
- Johnson Cann (b. 1937), geologist
- Colin Cherry (1914–1975), cognitive scientist
- Ralph Chubb (1892–1960), poet, printer and artist
- Sally Connolly (b. 1976), literary critic, author, and academic
- Charles "Nick" Corfield (b. 1959), mathematician, computer programmer, and founder of several startup companies in Silicon Valley
- Rogers Covey-Crump (b. 1944), singer (tenor), member of The Hilliard Ensemble
- Charles Crawford (b. 1954) British diplomat and speechwriter
- Graham Dow (b. 1942), Bishop of Carlisle
- Bruce Duncan (b. 1938), Anglican priest
- Chris Duffield (b. 1952), Town Clerk and Chief Executive of the Corporation of the City of London from 2003 to 2012.
- Larry Elliott, Economics Editor of the Guardian
- Ernest Gellner (1925–1995), philosopher and social anthropologist
- Dave Gibbons (b. 1949), Kirby Award winning comic book artist and co-creator of Watchmen
- Jack Goody, (1919–2015), social anthropologist
- Andrew Grant (b. 1968), novelist
- Ian Grant (b. 1930), mathematical physicist
- John Grimaldi (b. 1955), musician, songwriter, member of Argent
- David Grossman, political correspondent for Newsnight
- Hugh Grundy (b. 1945), musician, founder member of The Zombies
- Patrick Burnet Harris (b. 1934), former Bishop of Southwell
- Tim Hart (1948–2009), musician, founder member of electric folk band Steeleye Span
- Stephen Hawking (1942-2018), cosmologist and theoretical physicist
- Tony Hendra (1941-2021), satirist and writer
- General Sir Richard Lawson (b. 1927), Commander-in-Chief of Allied Forces Northern Europe 1982–96
- Yann Lovelock (b.1939), writer and interfaith worker
- Ed Macfarlane, member of the St Albans-based Indie band Friendly Fires
- Gregory Paul Martin (b. 1957), actor and writer
- Christopher Morris (b. 1938), TV news presenter, journalist and author
- Herbert Mundin (1898–1939), Hollywood character actor
- Mike Newell (b. 1942), film director
- Ray Pahl (1935–2011), sociologist
- Tony Penikett (b. 1945), writer and Canadian politician
- Charles Pereira (1913–2004), tropical agriculturist and hydrologist
- Justin Pollard (b. 1968), writer and historian
- Colin Renfrew (b. 1937), archaeologist
- Tim Rice (b. 1944), lyricist
- Charlie Scott (b. 1999), cricketer
- Joss Sheldon (b. 1982), author
- Sir Martin Smith (b. 1943), banker
- Harry Solomon (b. 1937), businessman
- Arthur Swinson (c. 1915–70), army officer, writer, playwright and historian
- Nicholas Tarling (1931–2017), historian
- Bob Wilkinson (1951–2021), rugby union player
- Richard Yeoman-Clark (1944-2019), BBC Radiophonics Engineer
- Kane Vincent-Young (b. 1996), association footballer

=== 21st century ===
- Josh de Caires (b. 2002), cricketer
- Charlie Bracken (b.2003), rugby union player for Saracens
- Justin Obikwu (b.2004), professional footballer for Coventry City and Trinidad and Tobago

== Notable teachers ==
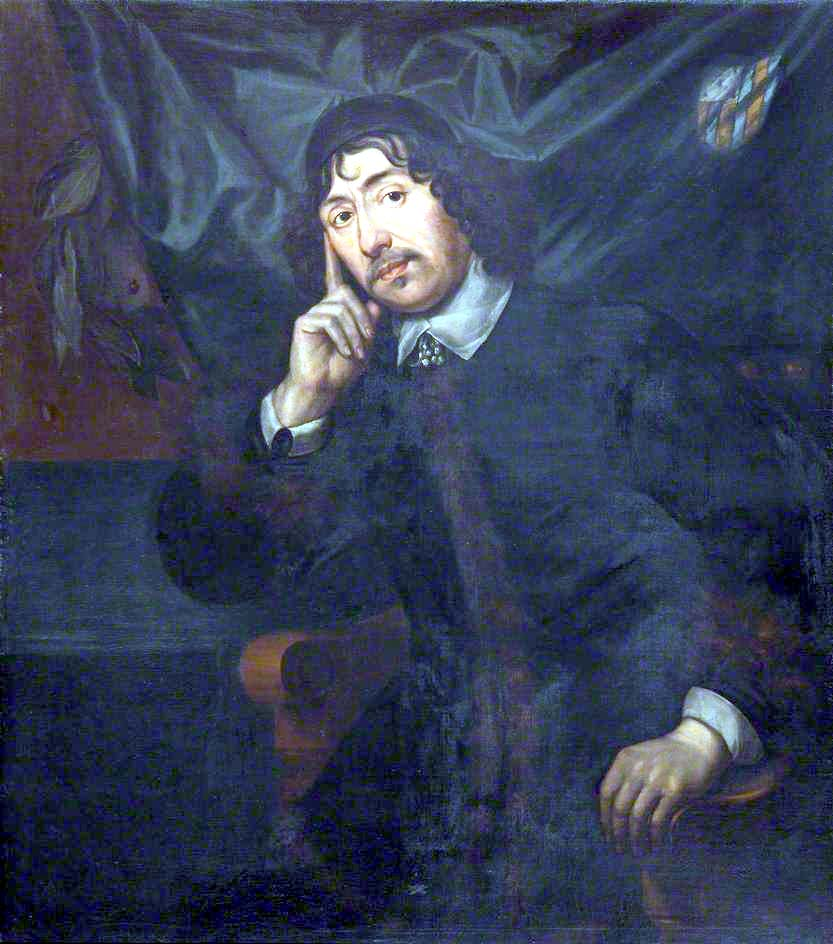
James Shirley

- Hilary Davan Wetton, musician
- David Franklin, broadcaster
- Geoffrey de Gorham (d. 1146), scholar, Abbot of St Albans Abbey 1119–1146
- Tommy Hampson (1907–1965), runner - 800m Olympic Champion (1932 in Los Angeles) and World Record holder (1:49.7)
- John Harmar was headmaster from 1626 to 1635
- Peter Hurford (1930-2019), organist
- Mark Ilott, cricketer
- Simon Lindley (b. 1948), organist
- John Mole (b. 1941), poet, critic and jazz clarinettist. City of London Poet in Residence since 1998 (under the Poetry Society's Poet in the City scheme)
- Alexander Neckam (1157–1217), scientist and teacher
- Herbert Edward Palmer (1880–1961), poet
- James Shirley (1596–1666), playwright
- Dikran Tahta (taught at the school 1955–1961), mathematician who taught Stephen Hawking
- Kyran Bracken (b. 1971), Rugby Union Player, World Cup Winner for England (Rugby Coach 2016-)

== See also ==
- List of the oldest schools in the United Kingdom
- List of the oldest schools in the world
