= Ian Grant (physicist) =

British mathematical physicist (1930–2025)

Ian Philip Grant (15 December 1930 – 1 March 2025) was a British mathematical physicist. He was emeritus Professor of Mathematical Physics at the University of Oxford and was elected a fellow of the Royal Society in 1992. He was a pioneer in the field of computational physics and is internationally recognised as the principal author of GRASP, the General Relativistic Atomic Structure Program.

== Education ==
St Albans School, Hertfordshire (1939–1948). Open Scholar in Natural Science, Wadham College Oxford, MA (Mathematics) (1951). Clarendon Laboratory, University of Oxford, D.Phil. (1954).

== Career ==
UKAEA. Mathematical Physics Division, Aldermaston. Senior Scientific officer (1957–1962); Principal Scientific Officer (1962–1964).

Joint Research Fellowship, Atlas Computer Laboratory (Science Research Council) and Pembroke College, Oxford (1964–1969).

Tutorial Fellow in Mathematics, Pembroke College, Oxford, now emeritus Fellow. (1969–1998)

Professor of Mathematical Physics, University of Oxford, now emeritus Professor.(1992–1998)

Visiting professor, Department of Applied Mathematics and Theoretical Physics, University of Cambridge. (2013-)

== Academic research ==
Grant made fundamental contributions to the development of the mathematical theory on relativistic effects in atomic physics, of importance for detailed studies of all atomic systems and particularly for heavy atoms and for highly ionised atoms in laboratory and astronomical plasmas. He was also instrumental in the creation of computer codes that are used worldwide (in particular GRASP) and have had a major impact on the understanding of both the foundations of the relativistic theory of many electron systems and on the precision of theoretical interpretation of a variety of properties of atoms. Professor Grant and his co-workers extended this approach to the relativistic modelling of molecular electronic structure and the development of the BERTHA computer package. Further research work included studies of electron scattering from heavy atoms and of the structures of molecules containing heavy atoms, culminating in the creation of the DARC computer package, integrating modules designed for calculations using relativistic R-matrix approach and GRASP. He also led important earlier work on radiative transfer in stellar and planetary atmospheres.

Grant's book Relativistic Quantum Theory of Atoms and Molecules: Theory and Computation reviews the field of relativistic atomic and molecular structure to the mid-2000s.

== Death ==
Grant died on 1 March 2025, aged 94.
