= Keith M. Ashman =

British theoretical astrophysicist

Keith M. Ashman (born 13 December 1963) is a British theoretical astrophysicist, educated at St Albans School, Hertfordshire, and Queen Mary College (Bachelor's), University of London (PhD). He was a professor at the University of Missouri-Kansas City, and has worked as a professor at the University of Kansas, and Baker University. He is the coauthor with Stephen E. Zepf of Globular Cluster Systems, and was one of three scientists (the others being François Schweizer and Steve Zepf) to suggest the formation of young globular clusters by colliding spirals might explain the large number of globular clusters present in elliptical galaxies. This was later supported by the findings of the Hubble Space Telescope.

He is also the author of "After the Science Wars," a text on the philosophy of science, and was a bass guitarist in the Lawrence, Kansas–based band "The Hefners."

In December 2007 Ashman left his tenureship at University of Missouri-Kansas City in order to pursue a career as a professional poker player.
