= John Ashman =

English cricketer (1926–2019)

Personal information
- Full name: John Robert Ashman
- Born: 20 May 1926; Rotherham, Yorkshire, England
- Died: 4 March 2019 (aged 92); Southbourne, West Sussex, England
- Batting: Left-handed
- Bowling: Slow left arm orthodox

Career statistics
Competition	First-class
Matches	34
Runs scored	149
Batting average	5.73
100s/50s	0/0
Top score	24
Balls bowled	4,606
Wickets	61
Bowling average	41.73
5 wickets in innings	3
10 wickets in match	0
Best bowling	7/111
Catches/stumpings	26/–
- Source: Cricinfo, 16 August 2022

John Robert Ashman (20 May 1926 – 4 March 2019) was an English cricketer, who played first-class cricket for Yorkshire and Worcestershire in the early 1950s.

Having played for Yorkshire's Second XI since the age of 20, Ashman was given his first-class debut against Surrey at Headingley in June 1951. He took four wickets in the match, including that of Test player Arthur McIntyre in both innings, but was then returned to the seconds. Indeed, this was the only first-team appearance he made for Yorkshire, and after a year out the following season he moved to Worcestershire for 1953.

Ashman came straight into the first team at New Road for the tour match against the Australians in late April. Although he took no wickets in a high-scoring draw, he was retained for the County Championship match against Somerset which followed. In this he returned an excellent match analysis of 36-24-36-5, and this set him up well to keep his place for the season. In all he took 41 first-class wickets at an average of 43.85, with a best return of 5–40 against Glamorgan in mid-May; Worcestershire lost this game by a single run.

In 1954, Ashman played ten further games for the county, mostly in the middle of the season, but he did not have as much success as he had the previous year. He did record a career-best 7 for 111 against Oxford University, and 3 for 80 against their Cambridge counterparts, but these two performances aside he could not manage more than a single wicket in an innings.

The disastrous game against Surrey at The Oval in late August, when Worcestershire were humiliatingly dismissed for 25 and 40, proved to be his last in first-class cricket (Ashman took the single wicket of Bernie Constable), although he did turn out a couple of times for the Second XI in 1955.

Ashman died in Southbourne, West Sussex in March 2019 at the age of 92.
