= James Ashman =

American businessman (1848–1912)

James W. Ashman (March 25, 1848 – March 28, 1912) was a 19th-century businessman who served two years on the Los Angeles, California, Board of Education. He was a member of the Los Angeles City Council from 1894 to 1898, where he championed the establishment of the city's first fire station composed of African-Americans.

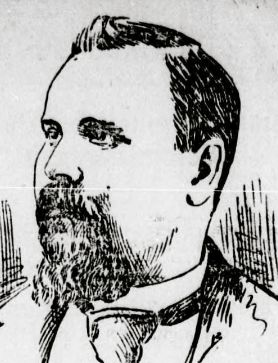
Ashman

Ashman was born in England on March 25, 1848, and came to the United States in 1870, when he settled in Pittsburgh, Pennsylvania. He was a locomotive engineer for a dozen years with the Pennsylvania Railroad, then moved to Los Angeles in 1884.

He was a founder of the Atlas Milling Company of that city and was later affiliated with the Keystone Milling Company. In 1897 he was president of the Los Angeles chapter of the International Order of Odd Fellows.

A Democrat, Ashman served two years on the Los Angeles Board of Education and was elected to the City Council in 1894 for a two-year term, then was reelected in 1896. During his councilmanic years, he successfully urged that fruit and vegetable markets be inspected by the city health department. He also introduced a resolution that city employees be paid twice a month instead of once, to keep them "out of the hands of the money sharks."

In 1895, according to the Los Angeles Herald:

Councilman Ashman caused a mild sensation by moving that the strength of the fire department be increased by the addition of a company to be composed exclusively of colored men. Ashman is a Democrat, and his motion caused Councilman [Frank Styles] Munson, who is the Republican leader, to gasp with astonishment. Munson, however, proved equal to the occasion by moving that the resolution be referred to the board of fire commissioners.

The resolution recommended to the fire commissioners that "they arrange as soon as practicable for an engine company to be composed of colored men," but in November 1898 the action had still not been accomplished so Ashton once again introduced a motion to the same effect, noting that "The colored people of our city are wholly without recognition in this important department of public service." It was adopted unanimously.

Upon his retirement from the City Council it was announced that he had been appointed a police commissioner.

Ashman was married to Elizabeth, who died in December, 1908. Their children were Mrs. Jesse W. Dutton and Bart Ashman. Ashman himself died in Los Angeles on March 28, 1912.
