= Andreas Belfortis =

Italian printer

Andreas Belfortis was an early printer, active in Ferrara in the second half of the fifteenth century.
