= Piviale dei Pappagalli =

13th-century liturgical cope, Sicily

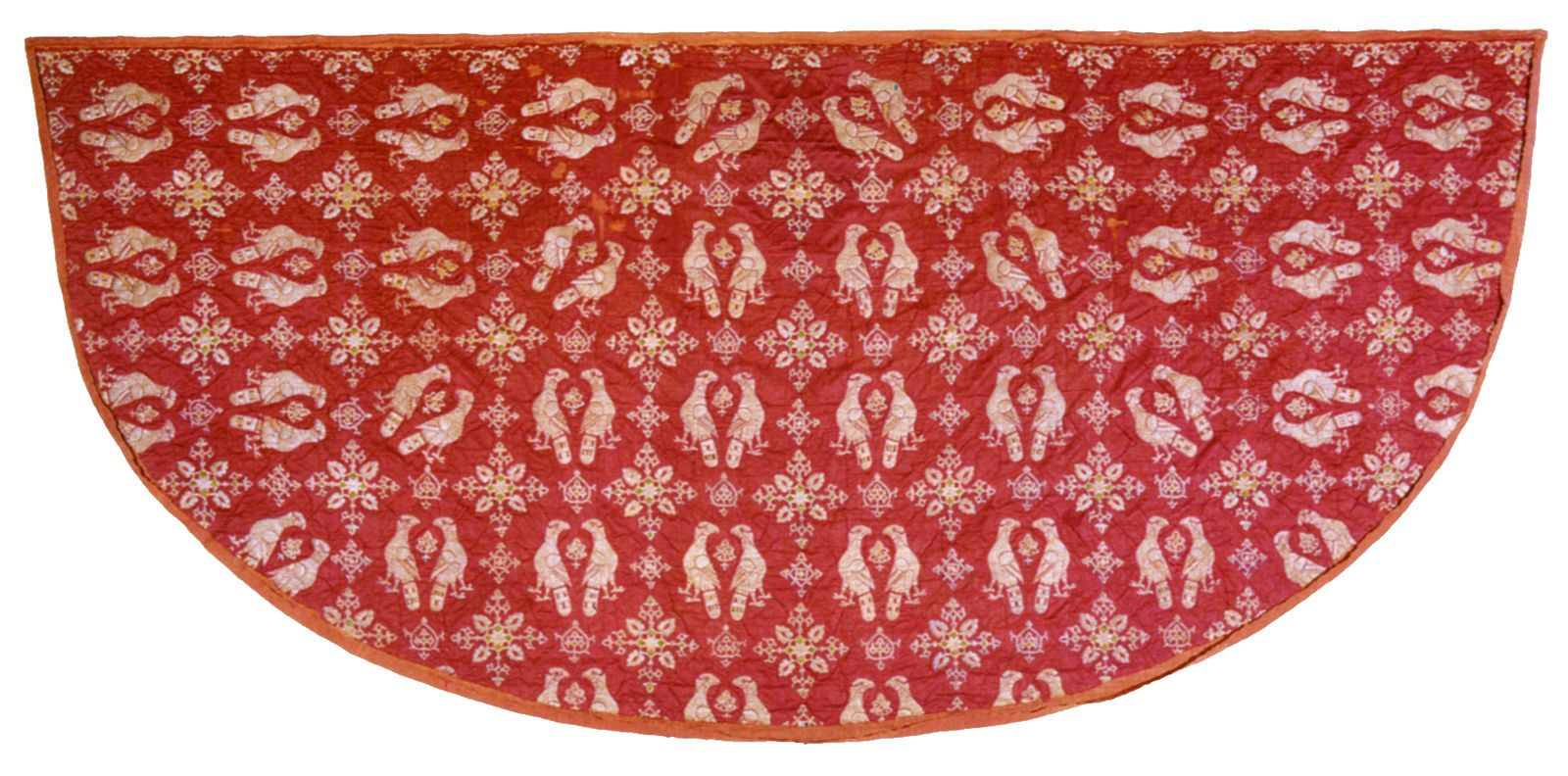
- Artist: Sicilian Workshop
- Year: 1225-1250
- Medium: Embroidered gold on samite
- Dimensions: 131 x 293 cm
- Location: Museo Diocesano, Vicenza

The Piviale dei Pappagalli (English: Parrot Cope) is a liturgical cope which was created in the 13th century in Sicily. As the name suggests, parrots are depicted on the coat and are repeated all over the textile. The origin and history surrounding the cope, as well as the precious materials and craftsmanship, make it an important textile held within the permanent collection of the Diocesan Museum of Vicenza.

== History ==
=== Donation ===
There remains a debate at the heart of the Piviale dei Pappagalli history between two conflicting histories. The most popular theory is that the object was donated from King Louis IX of France to Bartolomeo da Breganze alongside the reliquaries of the Thorn of Christ and of the True Cross (1259). During the Bishops return to Vicenza (1260), he constructed the Church of Santa Corona as a place for these relics, the location of which has a symbolic meaning as it was previously a place for the Cathars, who were heretics, hence the presence of the relics and church acted as a cleanser and purifier for this previous perceived evil.

As this textile is said to be produced in a Sicilian workshop, it is important to stress King Louis IX connection to Sicily which is made clear through his brother Younger Brother Charles of Anjou, who attained a short reign as King of Sicily (1266–1282). His ascension as King came to fruition through his involvement in the Eighth Crusade which was financially aided by the Pope, specifically Pope Urban IV as well as his brother King Louis IX, which allowed him to further wield influence over the Italian Guelphs and Papal elections. Although the emergence of the Sicilian Vespers rebellion ended Charles of Anjou's reign, it is possible that he may have attained the Piviale during this time and brought it back to Paris and the noble courts. The arrival of the Pivale in Vicenza through the bishop is not documented; thus, this missing evidence of its donation and attribution leads scholars to believe in another hypothesis.

Some scholars believe that it is more plausible that the Piviale could have been gifted from Federico II to Ezzelino da Romano, as the presence of Federico II in the Veneto region is very well documented, specifically in regards to his connection to Vicenza, as Ezzelinos tyranny is also well known, with the fact that he ruled over Vicenza from 1236 to 1259 with the aid and support of Federico II, demonstrating his strong connection to Ezzelino as a close confidant and ally. In addition, Ezzelino married Federico's daughter, Selvaggia (1238) and it is possible that the mantle was donated to him on this occasion as a matrimonial gift. Following the end of his reign, the liberation of Vicenza (1259–1260) allowed Bishop Bartolomeo da Breganze to assume his leadership position, placing the Piviale within his jurisdiction, as the textile would have passed from Ezzlino's death to the commune of Vicenza then to the Church of Santa Corona, for which the Bishop had built.

Although neither of these theories has physical evidence of the inventory of the piece to support them, it can be said that a connection to King Louis IX, may have facilitated stronger associations and more powerful connections than the tyrannical presence of Ezzelino, who was aligned with the party of the Ghibellines, who strongly detested papal influence. Here, the object would have attained even greater value following King Louis IX canonisation as St. Louis (1297), heightening its significance as a contact relic of a sanctified object. King Louis IX's stronger association to his Christian faith provides a stark contrast to Ezzelino's excommunication as a heretic by Pope Innocent IV, justifying the reason why the Church of Santa Corona would want to erase their connections with a heretical past and a tyrannical leader. Thus, despite the inability to provide any certainty to this change of history, there is a definite reasoning and motive to change the legend and backdate the gift under the already recorded donation inventory from the King of France.

=== Provenance ===
Although there is no explicit scholarly material or records which indicates the exact location and workshop which this textile was made, we can assume that due to the lack of silk workshops following the expulsion of Muslims by Frederick II (1220) and the influx of Christian migration, which led to the deviation of silk to raw material such as cotton and linen, that the Piviale must have been made in one of the largest and remaining textile factories within Sicily, that being Palermo's Tiraz Royal Factory.

=== Restoration ===
Within the chest of the church of Corona, the director of the Diocesano Museum, Msgr. Francesco Gasparini found a piece from the textile of the Piviale dei Pappagalli, which aided the restoration process as it allowed proper analyses to ensue, one that had not been able to occur before due to the fragility of the piece. As a result, this led to the publication of a volume of academic text dedicated to the Pivale itself. Within this text, the restorers and conservators made a critical analysis of exactly where the piece of fabric could have been positioned in the fabric, leading to a further awareness and understanding that the fabric as a whole was shortened and cut off at the edges.

== Description ==
=== Technique and materials ===
The Parrot Cope is made of red samite (from the Greek έξαμιτόι ), a high quality and cost-effective material, derived from the union of six threads that make up the weave. To create a fabric of this size, an ad hoc tension loom would have been used, making the process even more expensive. The shamito technique was typically oriental but is also documented in Palermo in the 12th and 13th centuries.

The yarn is made with the laid gold technique, which uses threads with a yellow silk core wrapped in a thin gilded silver foil, and polychrome threads corresponding to the parrots' tails.

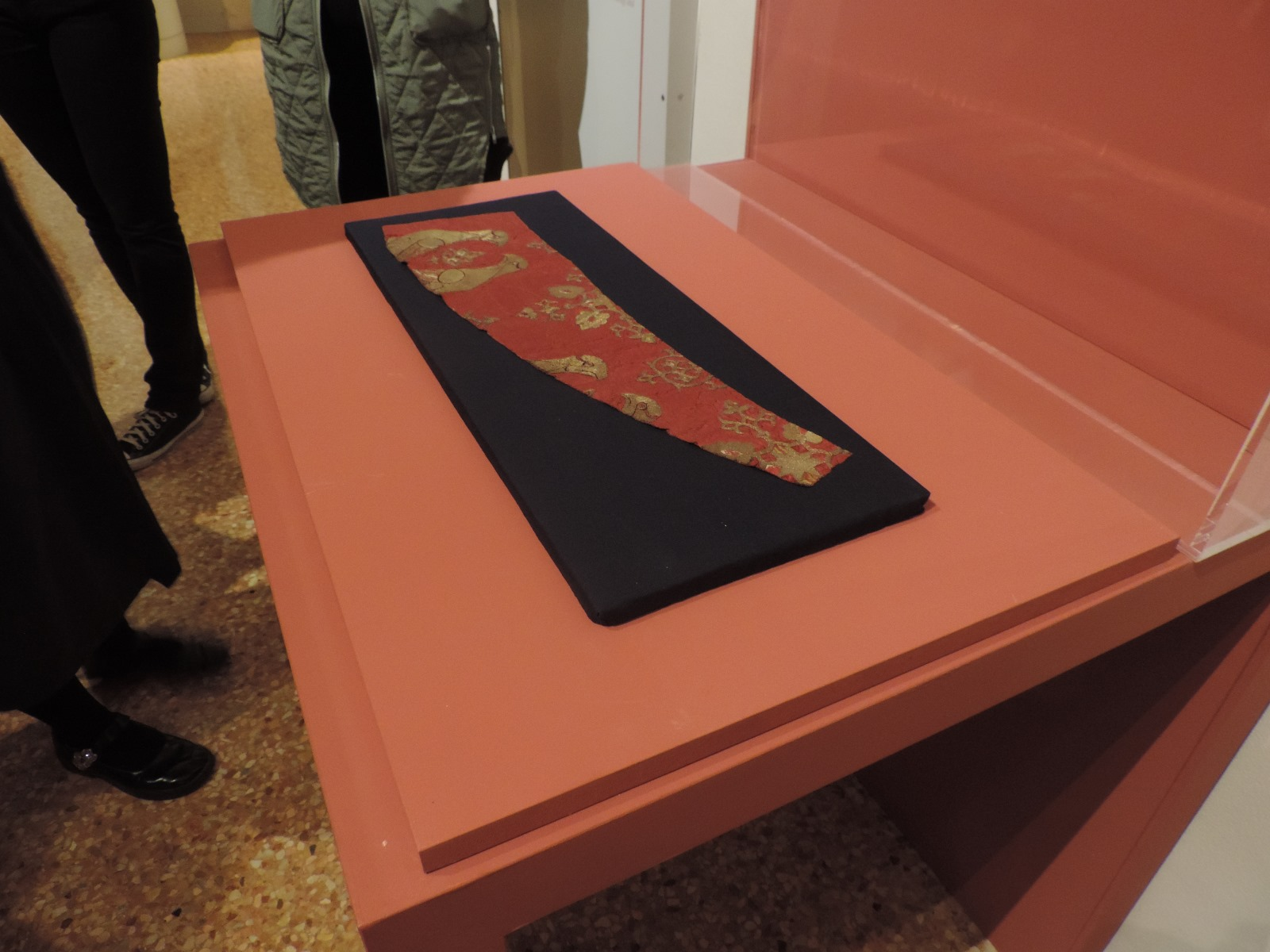
Fragment found by Mons. Francesco Gasperini

The dye used is called chermes (or kermes), and is obtained by drying the carapace of Coccus Ilicis. Another type of dye, which has emerged in recent restorations, is madder (Rubia Tinctorum), a less expensive red dye; in the case of the Parrot Cope madder was used to dye the warp, which remains hidden under the weft and, although madder was a less expensive dye than chermes, it was still quite luxurious. The particularity of this use of madder further testifies to the richness of the Vicenza cope.

In the Middle Ages the purple color of the cloak would have been associated with the royal origin of the fabric and at the same time with the blood of Christ and consequently the Passion.

=== Uses and meaning ===
From the sources it is possible to understand that the parrot cope could also be worn by lay people, as suggested by Eustachio of Bologna, Prior of the preaching fathers of Vicenza, in a letter to Giambattista Marini:

«The aforementioned cope made from the mantle of St. Lodovico is to be kept in a locked sacristy, which is kept in a safe and is only carried by superiors and great lords.» (Letter from Eustachio da Bologna to Giambattista Marini, 28 July 1663)

From this letter we can deduce the importance given to the cope starting from the seventeenth century, and it was worn in the most important ceremonies although it was considered a contact relic. In 1692 it was decided to burn most of the liturgical vestments present in the Church of Santa Corona in order to obtain gold but the Parrot Cope was explicitly excluded from this practice.

«Ab hac tamen combustion exceperunt omnino pluviale quod ex traditione habetur confectum ex regal paludamento d. Ludovici Francorum regis et ab codem B. Bartolomeo de Bragantino dono traditum» (30 June 1692)

=== Iconography ===
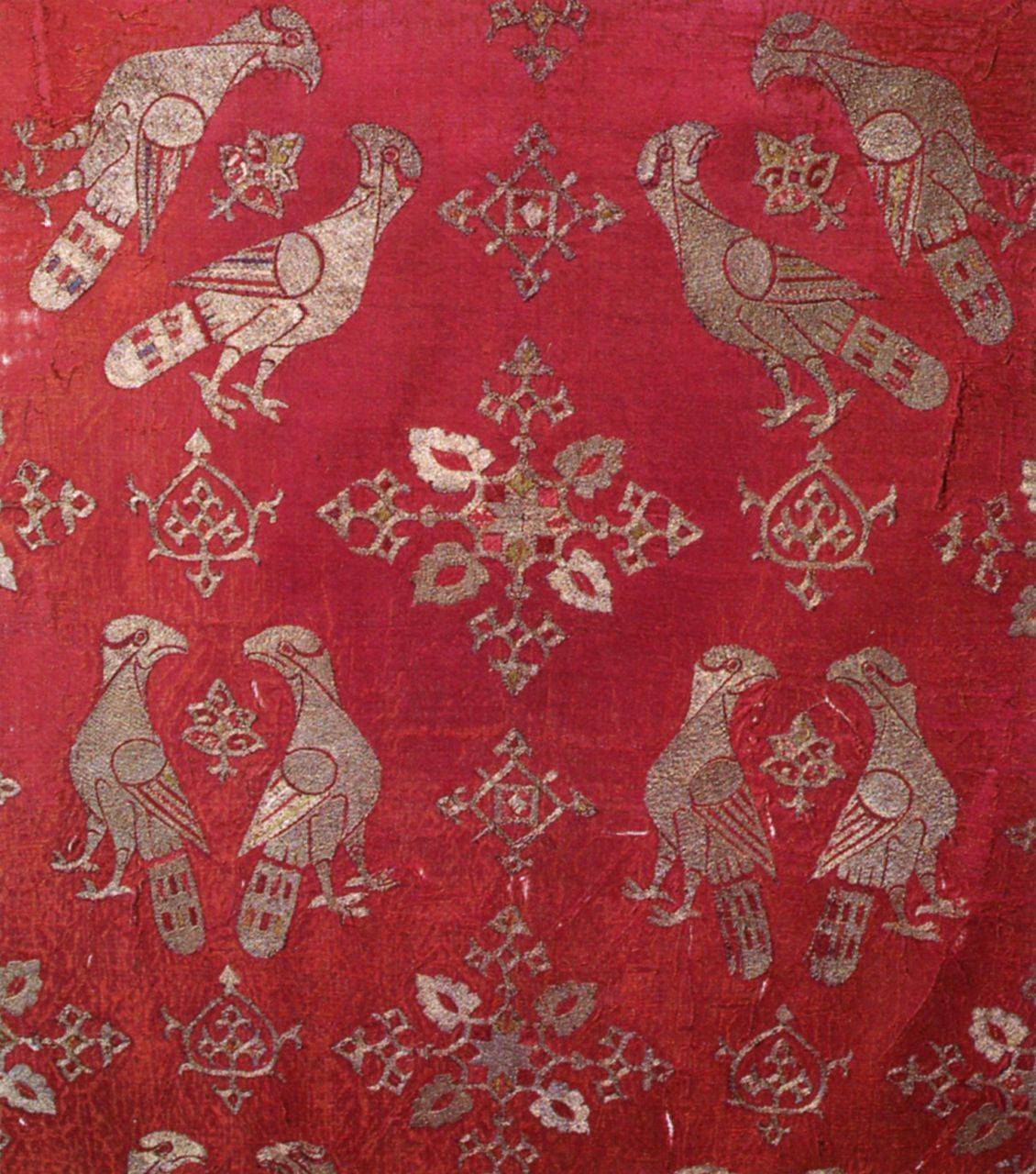
Detail of the pattern

The Piviale dei Pappagalli depicts a series of birds. The pattern is geometrically repeated throughout the drapery and when draped over the wearer's shoulders the birds hold an equal position, so that the feet are on the same level. As the name of the cope suggests the depicted birds are mostly referred to as parrots. Nevertheless, other scholars suggested the possibility that the birds are hawks. When it comes to the iconography, parrots were a popular motif, between the 12th and 14th century. Especially in Sicily, where eastern influences where heavy thanks to the Crusades. A similar motif and with similar provenance shows the Piviale of Boniface which represents parrots and hawks as well.

In the Christian world the parrot is believed to be a clean bird that disliked rain. This originated in the background of the parrot which according to the western world came from a mountain in India where it never rained. Due to that believe and the assumption that the parrot would lose its pure colours, when touched by rain, the parrot stood for cleanliness and purity. Whereas the rain was associated with sin.

But not just the origin of the bird was of significance, even more important was the main attribute of the parrot. The fact that it could speak like humans linked it directly to the prefiguration of the word of christ. Additionally, there are other connections to the virgin mary, because of the sound of the parrot, which was interpretated as the Christian exclamation "Ave".

The iconography of hawks is situated in a more courtly context, because of the association with falconry and the usage as a hunting companion. The hawk is in close contact with its master and was especially among nobleperson a symbole of prestige. Mastering the art of falconry and participating in hunting activities hierarchised and secured social positions at court. Therefore, the hawk symbolised regal power and royalty. In connection with the provenance of the cope, Friedrich II. book De arte venandi cum avibus, which was published 1248 in Sicily, could shed some light on a possible identification of the birds.

=== Hood ===
The hood is what characterizes a cope as such. The term comes from the fact that originally it would have been a hood, however its shape changed over time into a more simplified one, resembling an upside-down triangle. Since the Piviale dei pappagalli was not originally a religious mantel, but a lay one, it did not have a hood, therefore one had to be made at a later time.

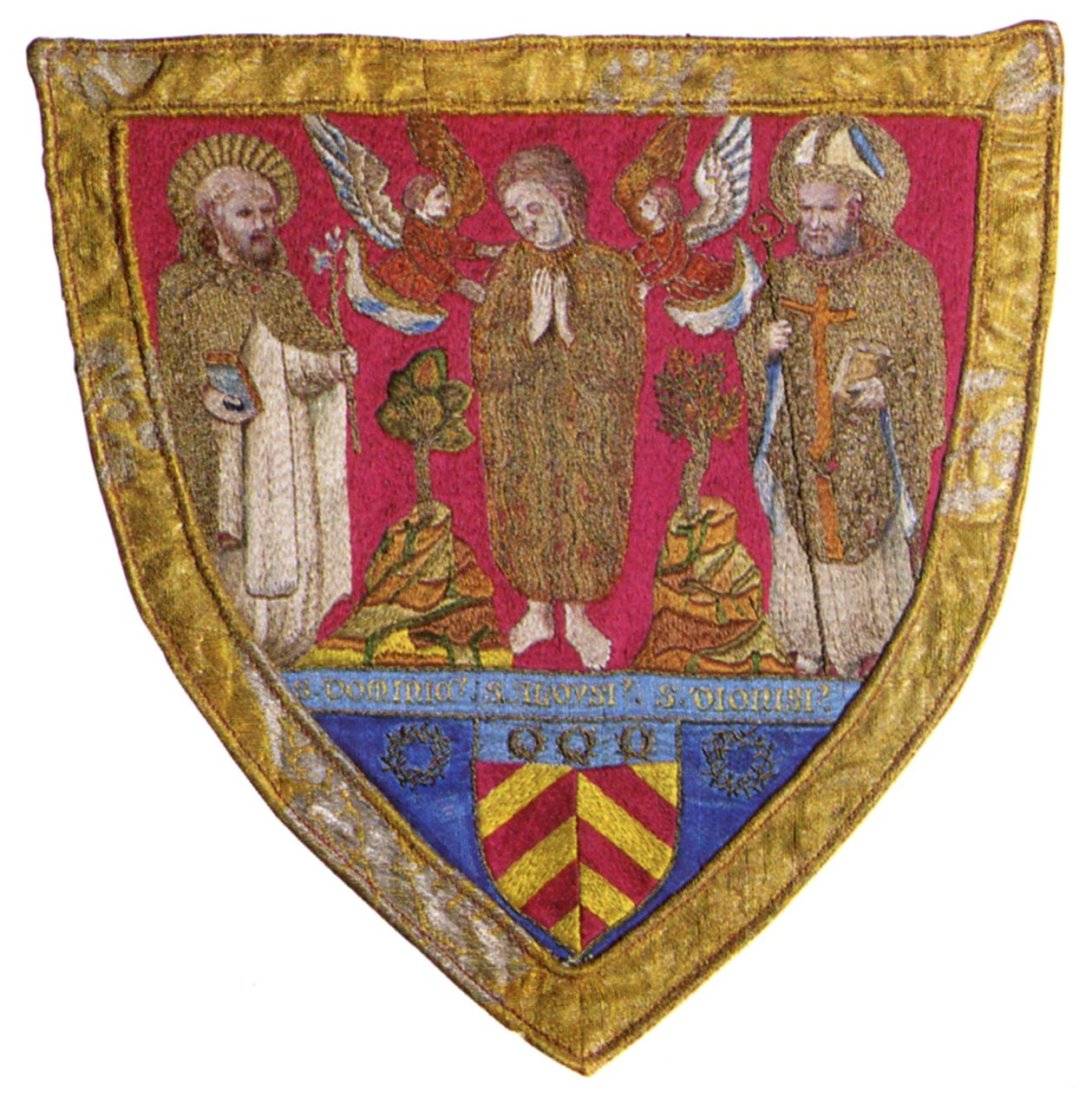
The Hood of the Piviale dei Pappagalli

The hood of the Piviale dei pappagalli is the result of a textile stratification, starting from the central piece with figures of saints, which is almost certainly an element of reuse. The blue band with the inscriptions of the names of the saints and the piece with the coat of arms are a later addition. Everything is surrounded by a gold band, which dates back to the 18th century, and by red damascus from the end of the 18th and beginning of the 19th centuries. The central part of the hood depicts three figures of Saints, two angels and natural details. The figure on the left is Saint Dominic, his presence is justified by the fact that the Church of Santa Corona is a Dominican one.

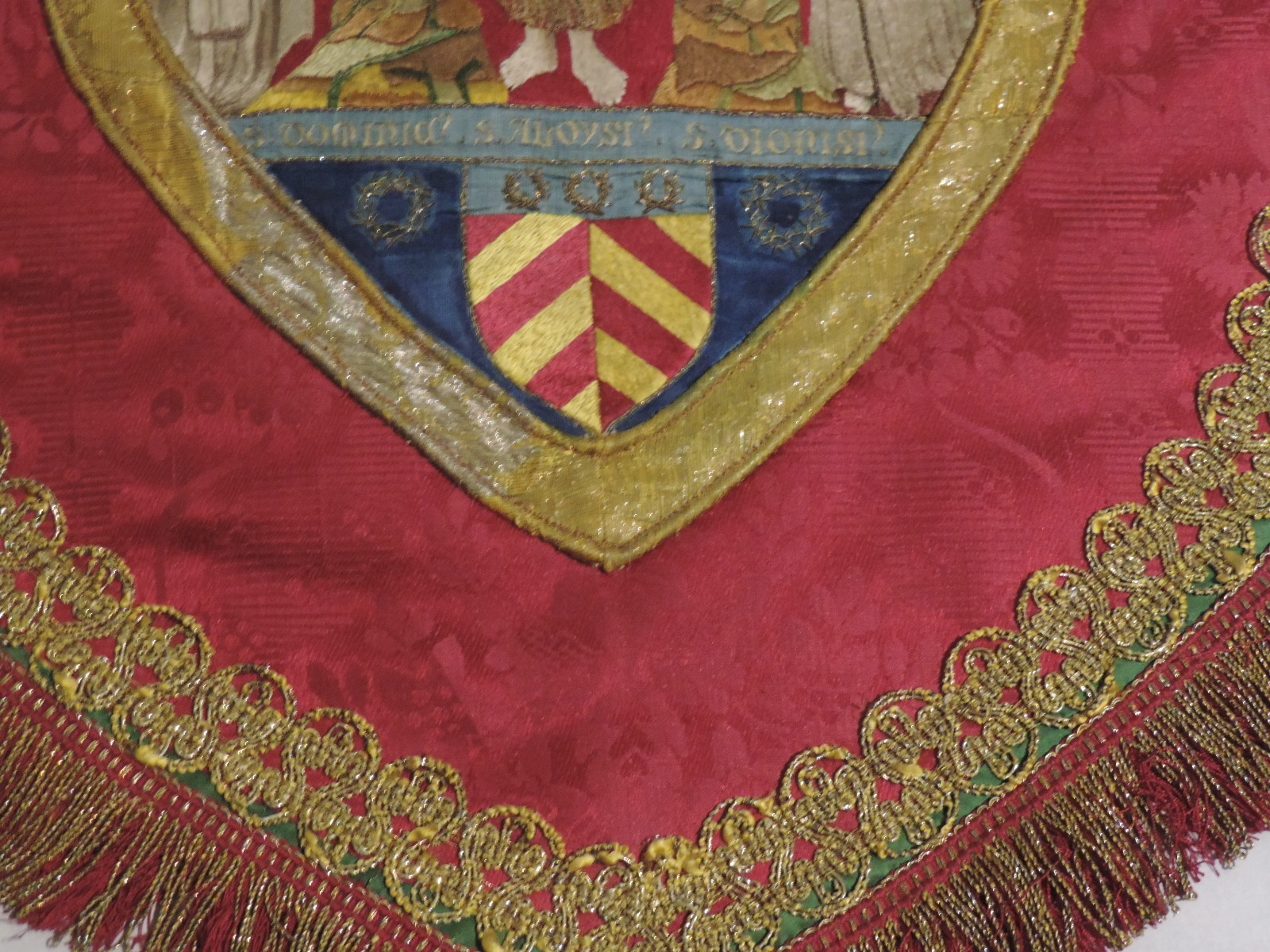
Detail of the Coat of Arms of the Piviale dei Pappagalli

On the right there is Saint Denis, as suggested by the inscription (“S. Dionisi”), it is however more plausible that the saint depicted is not the first bishop of Paris but instead Saint Dionysius the Areopagite or Pseudo Dionysius, since Bartolomeo da Breganze was the author of the De Venatione divinis amoris, a commentary of the texts of Dionysius the Areopagite. The reference to this specific saint can be seen as an homage to the legendary receiver of the Piviale dei pappagalli from Louis IX.

=== The coat of arms ===
Traditionally the coat of arms in the hood of the Piviale dei pappagalli was believed to be that of the Pigafetta family, however this is incorrect when the two coats of arms are confronted.

It is more likely that the coat of arms is to be linked to the figure of Alberto Fiocardo, canonic and archdeacon of the Cathedral of Vicenza, who built the Salvatore Chapel where he was buried in 1467.

The coat of arms would be a brisure of the original coat of arms of the Fiocardo Family, which was blue with a golden band, three laurel crowns, three eight pointed stars and a “capriolo”. However, there are no documents that testify a link between Alberto Fiocardo and the Church of Santa Corona.

== See also ==
- Roman Catholic Diocese of Vicenza
- Museo Diocesano di Vicenza
- Church of Santa Corona
- Louis IX of France
- Frederick II, Holy Roman Emperor
- Ezzelino III da Romano

== Bibliography ==
- Frederick and Sicily: from land to crown. Palermo, Italy: Ediprint. 1995. ISBN 88-7260-051-0.
- Avagnina, Maria Elisa (2014). Il piviale dei pappagalli: dal trono all'altare. Vicenza: Fondazione Giuseppe Roi. ISBN 9788864480756.
- Bishop, Edmund (1918). "The Origin of The Cope". Liturgica Historica. Oxford.
- Bortolan, Domenico (1889). Santa Corona. Chiesa e concento dei dominicani in Vicenza.
- Clason, Christopher (2015). Animal, Birds and Fish in the Middle Ages. Vol. 1. Berlino, Munchen, Boston: De Gruyter.
- Poli, Doretta Davanzo (1994). "Il piviale dei pappagalli". Arte e Documento (8).
- Poli, Doretta Davanzo (1980). "Oggetti sacri del secolo XVI nella diocesi di Vicenza". In Motterle, Tullio (ed.). Piviale dei pappagalli. Vicenza.
- Poli, Doretta Davanzo (1995). "Il naturalismo decorativo nelle stoffe occidentali". Centro studi di storia del tessuto e del costume. 7. Venezia: Civici Musei.
- Poli, Doretta Davanzo (1996). La porpora. Venezia: Istituto Veneto di scienze, lettere e arti.
- Devoti, Donata (1974). L'arte del tessuto in Europa. Milano: Bramante.
- Dunbabin, Jean (2011). The French in the Kingdom of Sicily, 1266-1305. Cambridge University Press.
- Papagei | animaliter - Tiere in der Literatur des Mittelalters. Mainz Johannes Gutenberg-Universität.
- Elster, Christiane (2018). Die papstlichen Geschenke Papst Bonifaz' VIII. (1294-1303) an die Kathedrale von Anagni. Petersburg: Michael Imhof Verlag.
- Elster, Christiane (2022). Textile gifts in the middle ages. Objects, actors and representations, "Introduction towards an unpacking of the medieval textile gift". Bibliotheca Hertziana.
- Errera, Isabella (1911). Il piviale di Santa Corona a Vicenza. Vol. XIV. L'Arte.
- "Ezzelino III da Romano". Enciclopaedia Britannica. 21 April 2024.
- "Ezzelino III Da Romano".
- Hoke, Ernst; Petrascheck-Heim, I. (1977). "Microprobe Analysis of Gilded Silver Threads from Mediaeval Textiles". Studies in Conservation. 22 (2): 49–62. doi:10.1179/sic.1977.008.
- Farmer, Sharon (2017). The Silk Industries of Medieval Paris: Artisanal Migration, Technological Innovation, and Gendered Experience. Philadelphia: University of Pennsylvania Press.
- Hughes, Muriel J. "Marco Polo and Medieval Silk". Textile History.
- Kania, Katrin (2010). Kleidung im Mittelalter. Materialien - Konstruktion - Nahtechnik. Ein Handbuch. Koln: Bohlau Verlag.
- "Piviale - Treccani". Enciclopedia dell' Arte Medievale. 1998.
- Schnier, Jacques (1952). "The Symbolic Bird in Medieval and Renaissance Art". The American Imago; A Psychoanalytic Journal for the Arts and Sciences. 9 (2): 89–117. PMID 14952471.
- Smit, Timothy (2021). Weaving Connections: Sicilian Silk in the Medieval Mediterranean.
- Vatikan (1258–1266). "Pal. lat. 1071 Friedrich". Über die Kunst mit Vögeln zu jagen. Süditalien: Biblioteca Apostolica Vaticana.
