= De arte venandi cum avibus =

Latin treatise by Emperor Frederick II

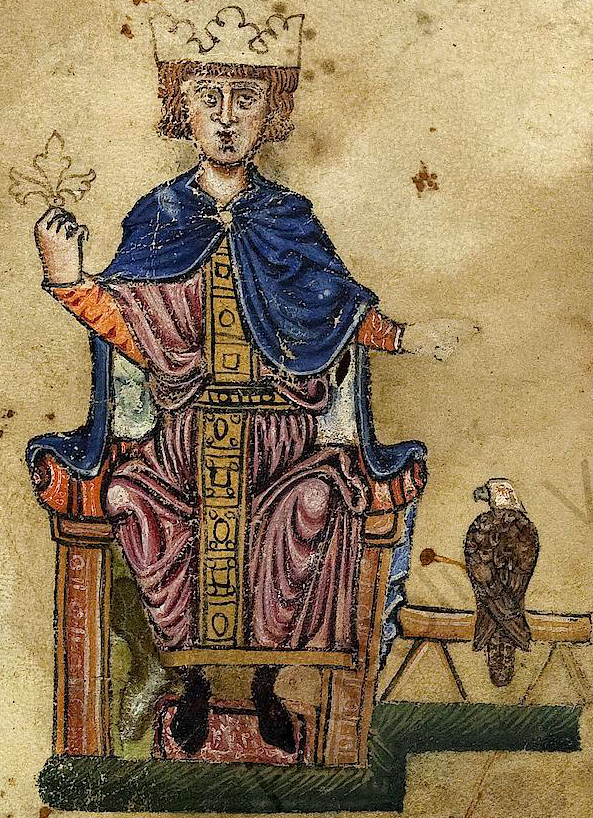
Frederick II on the second page of the "Manfred manuscript" (Biblioteca Vaticana, Pal. lat 1071)

De Arte Venandi cum Avibus (lit. 'On The Art of Hunting with Birds') is a Latin treatise on ornithology and falconry written in the 1240s by the Holy Roman Emperor Frederick II. One of the surviving manuscripts is dedicated to his son Manfred. Manuscripts of De arte venandi cum avibus exist in a two-book version (Manuscripts at Rome, Vienna, Paris (2x), Geneva and Stuttgart) and in a six-book version (Manuscripts at Bologna, Paris, Nantes, Valencia, Rennes, and Oxford).

== Versions ==
The work is divided into six books:

- Book I: The general habits and structure of birds
- Book II: Birds of prey, their capture and training
- Book III: The different kinds of lures and their use
- Book IV: Hunting cranes with the gyrfalcon
- Book V: Hunting herons with the saker falcon
- Book VI: Hunting water-birds with smaller falcons

=== Manuscripts containing six books ===
Surviving manuscripts fall into two groups: those that include all six books and those that include only the first two. All of the manuscripts containing the six books derive from a 13th-century codex now in the library of the University of Bologna. (Note: Biblioteca Universitaria di Bologna MS. Lat. 419 (717)) It is possible that this was one of the manuscripts produced during Frederick's lifetime. The 144 parchment folios measure 20 cm × 27 cm (7.9 in × 10.6 in). The text is split in two columns each containing 47 lines. The two prologues and each of the six books begin with a miniature initial. On the first page there is a dedication to "M. E." Several names have been proposed for the identity of M. E. including Malik El-Kamil (Al-Kamil), a Sultan of Egypt who died in 1238 and "magister Encius", a master falconer of Frederick's court.

There are five copies of the Bologna manuscript, all of which have sections omitted. They are held by libraries in Paris, Nantes, Valencia, Rennes and Oxford. Frederick II may have lost an illuminated copy of the De arte venandi cum avibus at the Battle of Parma in 1248. In a letter dating from 1264 to 1265 addressed to Charles I of Anjou, the Milanese merchant Guilielmus Bottatus offered to sell two large volumes that had once belonged to Frederick II. The volumes are described as containing text discussing dogs, falcons and their diseases. This description only partially matches the contents of the surviving copies of the De arte venandi cum avibus and some scholars have suggested that the letter may have been referring to other manuscripts.

=== Manuscripts containing two books ===
There are about seven copies of the Latin manuscript with the most famous copy being an illuminated manuscript commissioned by his son Manfred, a two-column parchment codex of 111 folios which is now in the Vatican Library in the Bibliotheca Palatina. The manuscript belongs to the two book version and is illustrated with brilliantly coloured, extraordinarily lifelike, accurate and minute images of birds, their attendants, and the instruments of the art. This manuscript contains additions made by Manfred, which are all clearly marked in the beginning by notations such as "Rex", "Rex Manfredus" or "addidit Rex". A 1596 Latin edition was published in Augsburg by Marcus Welser and reprinted in Leipzig in 1788–89 with commentary by the naturalist Johann Gottlob Schneider.

The first translation of this work was into French and was commissioned around 1300 by Jean II, Lord of Dampierre. The first translation into English (of the six-book version) was by Casey A. Wood and F. Marjorie Fyfe, as The Art of Falconry by Frederick II of Hohenstaufen which was published in 1943.

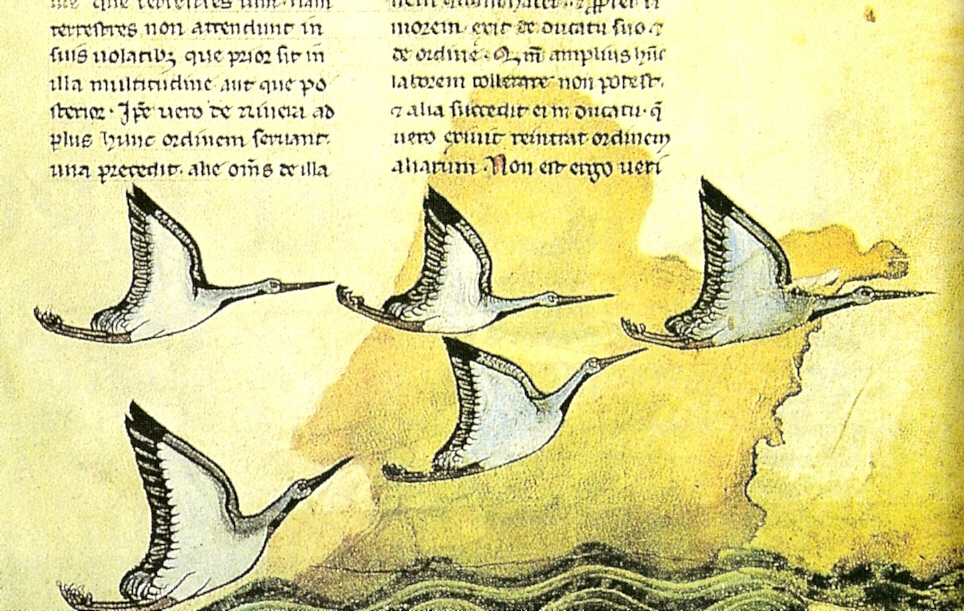
Bibliotheca Vaticana, Pal. Lat. 1071. folio 16r

== Content and analysis ==
This work is notable for the fact that Frederick II mainly confides in his own observations and experiments: he experimented with eggs to see if they would hatch only by the warmth of the sun; he tried to find out if birds used their sense of smell while hunting by covering the eyes of vultures. The author keeps to his intention, formulated in the preface, to describe the things as they are (“que sunt, sicut sunt”). It is a scientific book, approaching the subject from Aristotle, whom he likes to contradict. At the same time it is a scholastic book, minute and almost mechanical in its divisions and subdivisions.

Frederick II was familiar with Aristotle's treatises on animals in Latin translation: Liber Animalum, a translation by Michael Scot (1175 – c. 1232) from the Arabic translation Kitāb al-Hayawān. He was also familiar with De Scientia Venandi per Aves, a treatise by the Arab falconer Moamyn which was translated into Latin at his court by Master Theodore of Antioch, and much copied. The Vatican edition includes illuminations and has nearly 900 images of birds. It also includes figures of Frederick in a Byzantine pose and another, possibly of Manfred. While the historian Charles Haskins wrote approvingly of the bird illustrations and their lifelike appearance, the zoologist William Yapp found them largely inaccurate.

When discussing falcons reared in Iceland in Book II, the Emperor briefly mentions the island's proximity to Greenland. Because of this, his treatise serves as an early non-Scandinavian reference to North America.

== List of manuscripts ==
=== Six book manuscripts ===
	Manuscript	Date	Notes
A	Bologna, University Library, MS. Lat. 419 (717)	13th century	Illuminated with 8 miniature initials.
B	Paris, Bibliothèque Mazarine, MS. 3716	Early 15th century	Copied from A with passages omitted. Illuminated with 7 miniature initials. Bound with page order shuffled.
C	Nantes, Musée Dobrée, MS. 19	15th century	May have been produced for Astorre II Manfredi, seigneur of Faenza.
D	Valencia, University of Valencia, Historic Library, MS. 402	Early 15th century	Copy of A without the lacunae present in B.
E	Rennes, Municipal Library, MS. 227		No illumination. Direct copy of B including shuffled pages.
F	Oxford, Bodleian Library, MS. Digby 152	14th century	Fragmentary.

=== Two book manuscripts ===
	Manuscript	Date	Notes
a	Rome, Vatican Library, MS. Pal. Lat. 1071	13th century	Contains the additions made by Manfred but has several lacunae and several folios are missing from Book 1.
b	Vienna, National Bibliothek, MS. 10948	16th century	Copied from a and the only other Latin 2-book manuscript. In places the scribe has altered the text and has also missed out some passages.
c	Paris, Bibliothèque Nationale, MS. 12400	c. 1300	In French, translated from a.
d	Geneva, University Library, MS. Fr. (Petau) 170	1485-1490	In French, copy of c.
e	Cambridge MA, Houghton Library, MS. Typ. 129	1486	In French.
f	Stuttgart, Württembergische Landesbibliothek, Codex H.B. XI 34-a		In French.
g	Paris, Bibliothèque nationale, MS. Fr. 1296	15th century	In French, independent translation not copied from c.

== See also ==
- Cultural depictions of Frederick II, Holy Roman Emperor

== Cited sources ==
- Wood, Casey A.; Fyfe, F. Marjorie, eds. (1943). The Art of Falconry : being the de arte venandi cum avibus of Frederick II of Hohenstaufen. London: Oxford University Press.
