= Epistola prudenti viro =

Start of the letter in the Vienna manuscript

Epistola prudenti viro ('Letter to a Prudent Man') is an apocryphal letter from a Muslim philosopher to a Christian philosopher warning of an imminent Mongol invasion of Europe. It was written in Latin in the early 1240s, when the Mongol threat was current. It is known from four manuscripts now in Munich, Vienna, Paris and Marburg.

== Title ==
Epistola prudenti viro (also capitalized Epistola Prudenti viro), the name by which the letter is now known, is based on the letter's incipit (opening words), Prudenti viro. It was coined by Charles Burnett for his critical edition of the letter.

There is no title in the Munich and Vienna manuscripts. In the Marburg manuscript, the scribe added the rubric Epistola missa Theodori philosopho imperatoris Friderici ('letter sent by Theodore, the emperor's philosopher'). A marginal note corrects this to Epistola missa Theodoro philosopho imperatoris Friderici ('letter to Theodore, the emperor's philosopher'). In the Paris manuscript, the rubric reads Incipit epistola Alkindi achalif, de baldac philosophi ('[here] begins the letter of al-Kindī al-Khalīfa, philosopher of Baghdad'). The Paris manuscript also includes an explicit: Explicit epistola alkindi achalif de baldach philosophi. Fedor Veselov calls it the Letter of al-Kindī.

== Synopsis ==
Decorated initial P of the letter in the Paris manuscript. The initial M is for Macedum rex Alexander, Alexander king of Macedon.

The letter claims to be written by "al-Kindī, the priest and philosopher of the caliph of Baghdad" and is addressed to "Theodore, the philosopher of the most invincible emperor". These are historical figures who lived centuries apart. The Muslim philosopher Abū Yūsuf Yaʿqūb ibn Isḥāq al-Kindī lived in the 9th century. Theodore of Antioch, a Syrian Orthodox Christian, was the court philosopher and astrologer of Frederick II, Holy Roman Emperor. He was still living when the letter was written. The purpose of al-Kindī in writing is to warn Theodore and Frederick of the coming invasion of the Mongols.

Having discovered many works of prophecy during his travels, al-Kindī writes to summarize them for Theodore. He describes how Alexander the Great enclosed Gog and Magog and the 22 nations of the Tartars (Tartari) behind the Caspian Gates. These nations are Ishmaelites and, according to prophecy, "will possess the sanctuary of God" in the last days. Al-Kindī names and describes each nation and its king, occasionally adding information about the strange fauna in its kingdom. The prophesied escape of the enclosed nations is now at hand. A fox has burrowed through the mountains and shown the nations the way out. God is allowing them to ravage the world on account of its sins. Three armies are said to be marauding at the time of writing.

The names of the kings of the 22 nations vary slightly between manuscripts. In the Marburg manuscript, they are:

1. Anogig
2. Agem
3. Canenazten
4. Depar
5. Apodineyr
6. Libius
7. Limius
8. Parizeus
9. Decletius
10. Zarmenus
11. Tebleus
12. Carmacius
13. Calconus
14. Amardeus
15. Grimardius
16. Anafagius
17. Anafagius
18. Alaneos
19. Tarabus
20. Filonicius
21. Artineus
22. Saltarius

== Date and authorship ==
The letter may be said to date to around 1250. It seems, however, to have been in circulation by 1246. In the Munich manuscript, it is found in a collection of letters from the period 1241–1255. Since the collection is chronological and the undated Prudenti viro comes before the letter of 1246, it is probable that this is when it was copied into the manuscript. Laura Minervini favours a date of 1238–1240.

The letter can be connected to the court of Frederick II. It bears certain similarities to Frederick II's encyclical concerning the Mongols addressed to his fellow monarchs in 1241. In its manuscript tradition and through the text it was transmitted alongside, the letter is associated with courts of Popes Gregory IX and Innocent IV and with the courts of Frederick and his son, King Manfred of Sicily. It has been suggested that Theodore himself wrote the letter.

== Sources ==
The letter in the Munich manuscript

Most of the material in the letter can be traced to sources available in western Europe. There is no evidence of actual dependence on any Arabic source. The story of the enclosed nations is found in the Alexander Romance and in the Apocalypse of Pseudo-Methodius, but whereas the Apocalypse merely names the kings of the nations, Prudenti viro describes them, drawing on accounts of the strange races and animals of central Asia found in certain versions of the Romance and derived ultimately from Pliny the Elder, Solinus, Augustine of Hippo and Isidore of Seville. The author's immediate sources for the strange races and animals may have been the De rebus in Oriente mirabilibus and the Imago mundi of Honorius of Autun. Much of the text of Prudenti viro is identical to the first half of the contemporary Mirabilia mundi, although the direction of borrowing is not known. The three armies may be a reference to Friar Julian (1238), who claim that the Mongol khan had sent armies across the sea, against the Cumans and against the Rus'.

Although "the interest of this letter lies in its application of these traditional literary elements to a specific historical situation", the specific connections the letter draws between the traditional material and the contemporary Mongol invasions—Mongols identified with Magog, Mongols a monstrous race, the Caspian Gates being breached, Mongols as divine chastisement—are well attested in other works of the 13th century.

In the 13th century, al-Kindī was one of the most famous Arabic names in western Europe and thirty of his works were available in Latin translation. He was known as an astrologer who predicted that the rule of the Arabs would last 693 years. Minervini suggests, however, that the al-Kindī of the letter is in fact supposed to be the Nestorian Christian apologete ʿAbd al-Masīḥ ibn Isḥāq al-Kindī, who also lived in the 9th century and whose Apology was available in Latin.

== Purpose ==
It is unclear if Prudenti viro was "a mere academic exercise inspired by the contemporary atmosphere" or if it was "circulated and passed off as a genuine letter, and with a political purpose?" Calling the author a "forger", the text's first editor took the latter position. He argued that it was a piece of propaganda created in the service of Frederick II, both to stir up support for his planned crusade against the Mongols and to rebut the claims of his enemies that he was in league with them. Very tentatively, Burnett suggests that by blaming a fox (vulpes) for letting the nations out, the letter may be subtly throwing that accusation back at Frederick enemies, the Guelphs (Guelfi). Minervini agrees that the work is crusade propaganda.

On the other hand, Gabriele Bonomelli, in a dissertation on the political use of fictions, argues that the letter is an academic exercise in letter writing or ars dictaminis. The letter is essentially an unoriginal account of the enclosure of Gog, Magog and the nations and their prophesied release with the name of the Mongols (Tartars) taken from contemporary events and applied to the nations.

== Influence ==
Start of the letter in the Marburg manuscript

The detail of how a conniving fox helped the enclosed nations to escape is unique to Prudenti viro and the Mirabilia mundi. Through one of these, it found its way into Mandeville's Travels.

Albert of Behaim, the owner of the Munich manuscript, was a staunch opponent of Frederick II. He was probably drawn to the letter for its corroboration of the emperor's interest in astrology, for which he is criticized in a set of poems celebrating the battle of Parma in 1248 and also copied into the manuscript.

== Manuscripts ==
Prudenti viro is preserved in four manuscripts. Each of these also contains a copy of the Pseudo-Aristotelian Secretum secretorum in the Latin translation of Philip of Tripoli.

- Munich, Bayerische Staatsbibliothek, MS Clm. 2574b, a paper manuscript copied by Albert of Behaim or his secretary in the mid-13th century, containing many letters and astrological notes
- Vienna, Österreichische Nationalbibliothek, MS 512, a parchment manuscript of the 14th century, also containing Giovanni da Pian del Carpine's Ystoria Mongalorum
- Paris, Bibliothèque nationale de France, MS lat. 6978, a parchment manuscript of the 14th century
- Marburg, Universitätsbibliothek, MS 9, a composite manuscript on paper, Prudenti viro being in the 14th- or 15th-century part along with an authentic work by Theodore of Antioch

Karl Sudhoff brought the letter to scholarly attention in 1915. The first edition was published in 1984.

== Bibliography ==
- Bonomelli, Gabriele (2022). L'Uso politico della finzione: Le epistole fittizie nel medioevo latino e volgare (XII–XV s.) (PDF) (PhD dissertation). University of Bologna.
- Burnett, Charles F. S. (1984). "An Apocryphal Letter from the Arabic Philosopher al-Kindi to Theodore, Frederick II's Astrologer, Concerning Gog and Magog, the Enclosed Nations, and the Scourge of the Mongols". Viator. 15: 151–167. doi:10.1484/J.VIATOR.2.301438.
- Burnett, Charles F. S.; Gautier-Dalché, Patrick (1991). "Attitudes Towards the Mongols in Medieval Literature: The XXII Kings of Gog and Magog from the Court of Frederick II to Jean de Mandeville". Viator. 22: 153–168. doi:10.1484/J.VIATOR.2.301320.
- Hautala, Roman (2015). "Latin Sources' Information About the Mongols Related to Their Re-conquest of Transcaucasia". Golden Horde Review. 3: 6–22.
- Minervini, Laura (2019). "Teodoro di Antiochia". Dizionario Biografico degli Italiani (in Italian). Vol. 95: Taranto–Togni. Rome: Istituto dell'Enciclopedia Italiana. ISBN 978-88-12-00032-6.
- Seymour, M. C., ed. (2010). The Egerton Version of Mandeville's Travels. Early English Text Society, Original Series. Vol. 336. Oxford University Press.
- Sudhoff, Karl (1915). "Ein diätetischer Brief an Kaiser Friedrich II. von seinem Hofphilosophen Magister Theodorus". Archiv für Geschichte der Medizin. 9 (1): 1–9. JSTOR 20773110.
- Veselov, Fedor N. (2021). "Omens of the Apocalypse: The First Rus' Encounter with the Mongols through the Prism of the Medieval Mind". In Alexander V. Maiorov; Roman Hautala (eds.). The Routledge Handbook of the Mongols and Central-Eastern Europe: Political, Economic, and Cultural Relations. Routledge. pp. 15–35.
