= Mirabilia mundi =

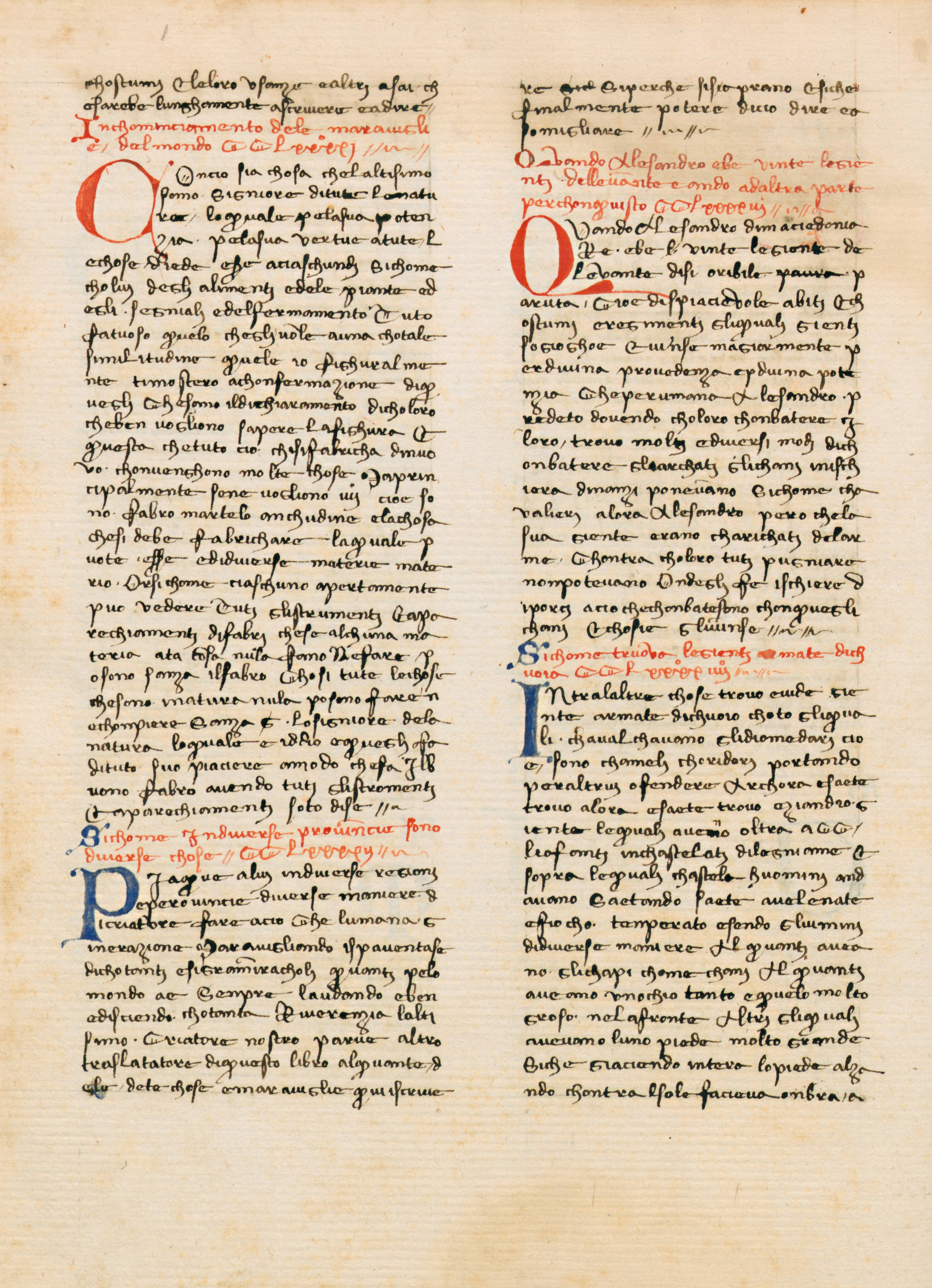
Start of the Tuscan translation of the Mirabilia in a 14th-century manuscript

Mirabilia mundi ('Marvels of the World') is a Latin compilation on natural wonders, many drawn from legends about Alexander the Great, intended to stimulate the mind to reverence of God. It was produced around 1240 and is preserved in two manuscripts.

The late medieval Mandeville's Travels depends in certain details on the Mirabilia.

== Content ==
The Mirabilia consists of a short introduction setting out the purpose of the work and three sections with the titles:

- "How Alexander subjugated the unclean races" (Qualiter Alexander subiugavit gentes immundas)
- "About the races" (De gentibus)
- "That familiarity takes away wonder" (Quod usus tollit admirationem), a variant of the ancient proverb "familiarity breeds contempt"

According to the introduction, "as a result of such great objects of wonder" as are described in the book "one should praise and revere God who created all things and accommodated them to the understanding of the human mind." The first section describes how Alexander the Great enclosed Gog, Magog and the 22 nations behind the Caspian Gates. The second describes the 22 nations and names their kings. These nations are identified with the Mongols (Tartars). They are said to be descendants of "Cham, son of Noah". In no other source are these nations said to be Hamites and this detail may reflect a misunderstanding of the Mongol title khagan, which was often spelled chaam in Latin.

The third section describes "the wonderful works of God" (opera Dei mirabilia) grouped under the headings "islands", "waters" (i.e., bodies of water), "men" (i.e., races), "brute animals", "birds" and "inanimate things".

== Sources ==
Start of the Mirabilia in the Bourges manuscript

The Mirabilia is an adaptation of "preexistent texts ... in a somewhat hasty and crude way", compiled "probably in the late 1230s or early 1240s". The first two sections together are identical in content and nearly identical in wording to the main body of the Epistola prudenti viro. They may have relied on the same (unidentified) source or the Epistola may have relied on the Mirabilia. No surviving manuscript of the Mirabilia, however, could be the exemplar for any manuscript of the Epistola prudenti viro, nor vice versa.

The Mirabilia claims to have taken information "from the [description] of the exploits of Alexander the Great" (ex gestis Alexandri magni). This is probably an unknown recension of the Historia de preliis, a Latin version of the Alexander Romance. Another source for the Mirabilia was the Imago mundi of Honorius Augustodunensis. The well known J^{3} recension of the Alexander Romance, while very similar to the Mirabilia, is probably indebted to it. The Alexandreis of Quilichinus of Spoleto may also be indebted to the Mirabilia.

The third section of the Mirabilia is derived mostly from chapters 85, 92 and 93 of the Historia orientalis of Jacques de Vitry, preserving the wording but varying the order.

== Manuscripts ==
The title Mirabilia mundi (or Liber de mirabilibus mundi) is found in the two surviving manuscripts of the text:

- Bourges, Bibliothèque municipale, 367, copied in Italy after 1277
- Vatican City, Biblioteca Apostolica, Vat. lat. 2035, copied in the mid-15th century

In addition, the Mirabilia was translated into Tuscan around 1300 and incorporated into a compilation that includes Italian translations of the Pseudo-Aristotelian Secret of Secrets and part of the Histona Tartarorum of Giovanni da Pian del Carpine. This anonymous compilation is found in at least four manuscripts. The translation of the Mirabilia is faithful but not always literal.

Patrick Gautier-Dalché has produced an unpublished edition of the text.

== Bibliography ==
- Burnett, Charles F. S.; Gautier-Dalché, Patrick (1991). "Attitudes Towards the Mongols in Medieval Literature: The XXII Kings of Gog and Magog from the Court of Frederick II to Jean de Mandeville". Viator. 22: 153–168. doi:10.1484/J.VIATOR.2.301320.
- Grignaschi, Mario (1982). "Remarques sur la formation et l'interprétation du Sirr al-ʾasrār". In W. F. Ryan; Charles B. Schmitt (eds.). Pseudo-Aristotle, The Secret of Secrets: Sources and Influences. The Warburg Institute. pp. 3–33.
- Hautala, Roman (2015). "Latin Sources' Information About the Mongols Related to Their Re-conquest of Transcaucasia". Golden Horde Review. 3: 6–22.
- Seymour, M. C., ed. (2010). The Egerton Version of Mandeville's Travels. Early English Text Society, Original Series. Vol. 336. Oxford University Press.
