= Theodore of Antioch (philosopher) =

Syrian Orthodox philosopher, physician and astrologer

The name of Theodore underlined in the prologue of his translation De scientia venandi per aves, from Beinecke MS 446

Theodore of Antioch (fl. 1226–1243) was a Syrian Orthodox philosopher, physician and astrologer from Antioch who served Frederick II, Holy Roman Emperor, as a scholar and diplomat from about 1230 until his death.

Theodore was knowledgeable in Arabic, Syriac and Latin, having studied in both Christian and Islamic milieus in Antioch, Mosul and Baghdad. He served the Seljuk sultanate of Rum and the Armenian kingdom of Cilicia for a time in the 1220s, but found greater success in the service of Frederick, primarily in Italy, where the emperor rewarded him with lands.

Theodore cast a horoscope for Frederick on at least one occasion; engaged in public debate with Dominican philosophers; prepared therapeutic concoctions for the emperor and for his friends; and wrote diplomatic correspondence in Arabic for the emperor. He corresponded with Piero della Vigna about the latter's health and with Leonardo Fibonacci about mathematics. He made several Latin translations from Arabic, including some of Averroes' commentary on Aristotle and the De scientia venandi per aves, a book about falconry. His longest original work and the only one to survive is a treatise on health addressed to the emperor.

According to Bar Hebraeus, when Theodore tried to quit Frederick's service without leave and was nearly found out, he committed suicide by poison. His fame was such that he appears in several fictionalizing works from later in the 13th century as a conduit of knowledge from East to West.

== Life ==
=== Antioch, Mosul, Baghdad ===
Theodore was born in Antioch, the capital of the Principality of Antioch, probably in the 1190s. He was Syrian Orthodox, but of his family background nothing is known. The only source on his early life and education is Bar Hebraeus's Mukhtaṣar taʾrīkh al-duwal, where he is called "the wise Theodore" (al-ḥakīm Thādhūrī).

Theodore learned Syriac and Latin in Antioch, where he also studied ancient Greek philosophy. He later moved to Mosul, where he studied under the Muslim scholar Kamal al-Din ibn Yunus (Note: During the Sixth Crusade, Frederick II sent questions to Sultan al-Kamil and the sultan passed them on to Ibn Yunus.) the works of al-Farabi, Ibn Sina, Euclid and Ptolemy. He returned to Antioch for a time before going back to Mosul. He later studied medicine in Baghdad. He probably finished his education about 1220. He taught for a time in Jerusalem, where the Melkite physician Ya'qub ibn Saqlan studied under him. Bar Hebraeus identifies him with a certain Theodore mentioned by Ibn al-Qifti. This Theodore taught in Jerusalem around 1184, however, and is unlikely to be the same person as Theodore of Antioch.

Theodore served Kayqubad I, sultan of Rum (r. 1219–1237), "but he found him strange and did not become close to him", in the words of Bar Hebraeus. He then moved to the court of Constantine of Baberon, regent (r. 1221–1226) for Queen Isabella of Armenia and father of King Hethum I, "but he did not enjoy their company". He left Armenia with an envoy from the Emperor Frederick sometime before 1230. The most likely occasion for an otherwise unrecorded embassy from Frederick to Armenia is during the preparations for the Sixth Crusade (1228–1229).

=== Court of Frederick II ===
The only sources for Theodore's career at Frederick's court are Latin writings from the West, although Bar Hebraeus records that Frederick gave him a fief in Sicily called Kamaha. One act of Frederick's refers to the place called Santa Cristina and the village of Prancanica as having been granted to Theodore for life.

In the Latin sources, Theodore is frequently given the title magister (master). He is also called imperialis philosophus (imperial philosopher), an unprecedented court title in the West, but one with parallels in the Islamic world. Western sources almost always call Theodore a philosopher (philosophus). This is the term Theodore uses to describe himself and it is the term the emperor uses to describe him. Bar Hebraeus also calls him a ḥakīm and failasūf, two Arabic terms meaning 'philosopher'.

In practice, Theodore served Frederick as a physician, astrologer, diplomat and amanuensis for diplomatic correspondence in Arabic. According to a late source, the chronicle of Antonio Godi, Frederick had his horoscope cast after the siege of Vicenza in 1236. The astrologer in question may have been Theodore. According to Étienne de Salagnac, Theodore stumped several Dominicans with philosophical arguments in Frederick's camp at the siege of Brescia in 1238 before Roland of Cremona showed up and defeated him in a debate. Another of Theodore's detractors, Rolandino of Padua, claims that in Padua in 1239 Theodore cast the emperor's horoscope standing atop a tower and using an astrolabe. According to Rolandino, who critiques his astrological knowledge, he predicted that Frederick would emerge victorious from his latest conflict. Rolandino is the only source to describe Theodore explicitly as an astrologer. Nevertheless, several scholars have seen him as Michael Scot's successor as court astrologer.

In December 1239, Frederick put a ship at Pisa at Theodore's service. The latter was returning from a trip abroad, perhaps on diplomatic business. In February 1240, Frederick sent him blank documents with his seal so that he could write accreditations in Arabic for two ambassadors to the king of Tunis, Abu Zakariya Yahya, to discuss the matter of the king's detained nephew, Abd al-Aziz. That same month he requested syrups and "violet sugar" or "sugar of violet" from Theodore, seemingly for therapeutic purposes. Petrus Hispanus, the author of the ophthalmological work Liber de oculo, claims Theodore as his teacher and as "the emperor's physician". Shortly before 1242, Frederick sent philosophical questions to the Almohad caliph Abd al-Wahid II (who passed them on to Ibn Sab'in) and to philosophers throughout the Muslim world from Egypt to Iraq to Yemen. Theodore was probably responsible for drafting these Arabic letters. A document of March 1243 records the holding of a vineyard in Messina by Theodore, "the emperor's philosopher".

Theodore was dead by November 1250, when Frederick granted his lands to others. Bar Hebraeus gives an account his death. Theodore, having pined for his homeland for many years, boarded a ship for Acre without imperial permission. When a stormed forced the ship into a port where Frederick was staying, he took poison out of shame "because the king would not have allowed someone like him to be killed".

== Works ==
Theodore was in contact with the mathematician Leonardo Fibonacci, who called him "the supreme philosopher of the imperial court". Fibonacci attached two letters addressed to Theodore to the end of his Flos and Liber quadratorum. In one of them, he correctly solves a mathematical problem posed to him by Theodore. For what integer values of x, y and z is each of the following sums the square of an integer:

$$x+y+z+x^2$$
$$x+y+z+x^2+y^2$$
$$x+y+z+x^2+y^2+z^2$$

The same problem is found in a work by Theodore's teacher, Ibn Yunus. Theodore probably also corresponded in Arabic with Judah ben Solomon ha-Kohen. Judah claims to have received from "the philosopher of the Emperor ... some questions on geometry" while he was living in Spain in 1233. These he "translated from Arabic into Hebrew" and answered to the satisfaction of the emperor. Although he disparagingly refers to "the man who pretended to be a philosopher in [Frederick's] presence", he admits to continuing a correspondence with him for the next ten years.

Epistola Theodori philosophi ad imperatorem Fridericum

A letter from Theodore to Piero della Vigna and Piero's response are preserved in a collection of Piero's letters. In his letter, Theodore informs the ill Piero that he is sending him "violet sugar".

From Arabic into Latin he translated Averroes' introduction to his larger commentary on Aristotle's Physics for the scholars of the University of Padua, possibly during his stay in Padua in 1239. He also translated a treatise on falconry by a certain "Moamin", known under the Latin title De scientia venandi per aves. The emperor revised his translation during the siege of Faenza in 1240–1241. He may be the translator of another work on falconry, the Ghatrif.

Theodore's only original work to survive outside of his regular correspondence is his Epistola Theodori philosophi ad imperatorem Fridericum, a treatise on a healthy regimen addressed to the emperor. Its date is uncertain. Its modern editor, Karl Sudhoff, praised its learning and style as preeminent among contemporary medical works. It relies heavily on the Secretum secretorum, (Note: The Secretum was translated from Arabic in Antioch by Philip of Tripoli sometime before 1230. The earliest citation of this translation in Europe is in the writings of Michael Scot and it probably arrived at Frederick's court in the period 1228–1235.) a copy of which Theodore knows that the emperor owns, but diverges from its recommendations in certain respects.

== Fictions ==
The false letter of al-Kindi to Theodore

Theodore appears as a minor figure in the prologue of the Book of Sydrac, a 13th-century French philosophical novel that purports to be a translation of an ancient text. Theodore's name is spelled Todre (or Codre) and he is called a philosophe. The prologue claims that Todre, who was in Frederick's service, acquired through bribery a copy of the book and sent it to the Latin patriarch of Antioch, Obert (probably Albert of Rezzato). The identification of Todre with Bar Hebraeus' Thādhūrī was already made by Moritz Steinschneider in 1886. It cannot be excluded that some truth lies behind the references to Theodore and Alberto in an otherwise fictional frame story. It is the only Western source that describes Theodore as coming from Antioch.

Theodore is mentioned in the astrological compendium Liber novem iudicum, which claims that "the Great Caliph sent Master Theodore to the same Emperor Frederick." Although Theodore cannot have had any connection with the sending of an Arabic version of Liber novem iudicum to Frederick, it is possible that the claim reflects the fact that Theodore was sent to Frederick as part of a diplomatic exchange.

Theodore is the addressee of the Epistola prudenti viro, a fictional letter from al-Kindi that includes legends about Alexander the Great in Central Asia. While chronologically impossible and clearly invented, the letter "may have reflected a belief that Theodore ... continued to receive missives from oriental sages" while in Europe. It has been speculated that Theodore was, in fact, the author of the Epistola.
