= Moamyn =

Medieval Arabic author

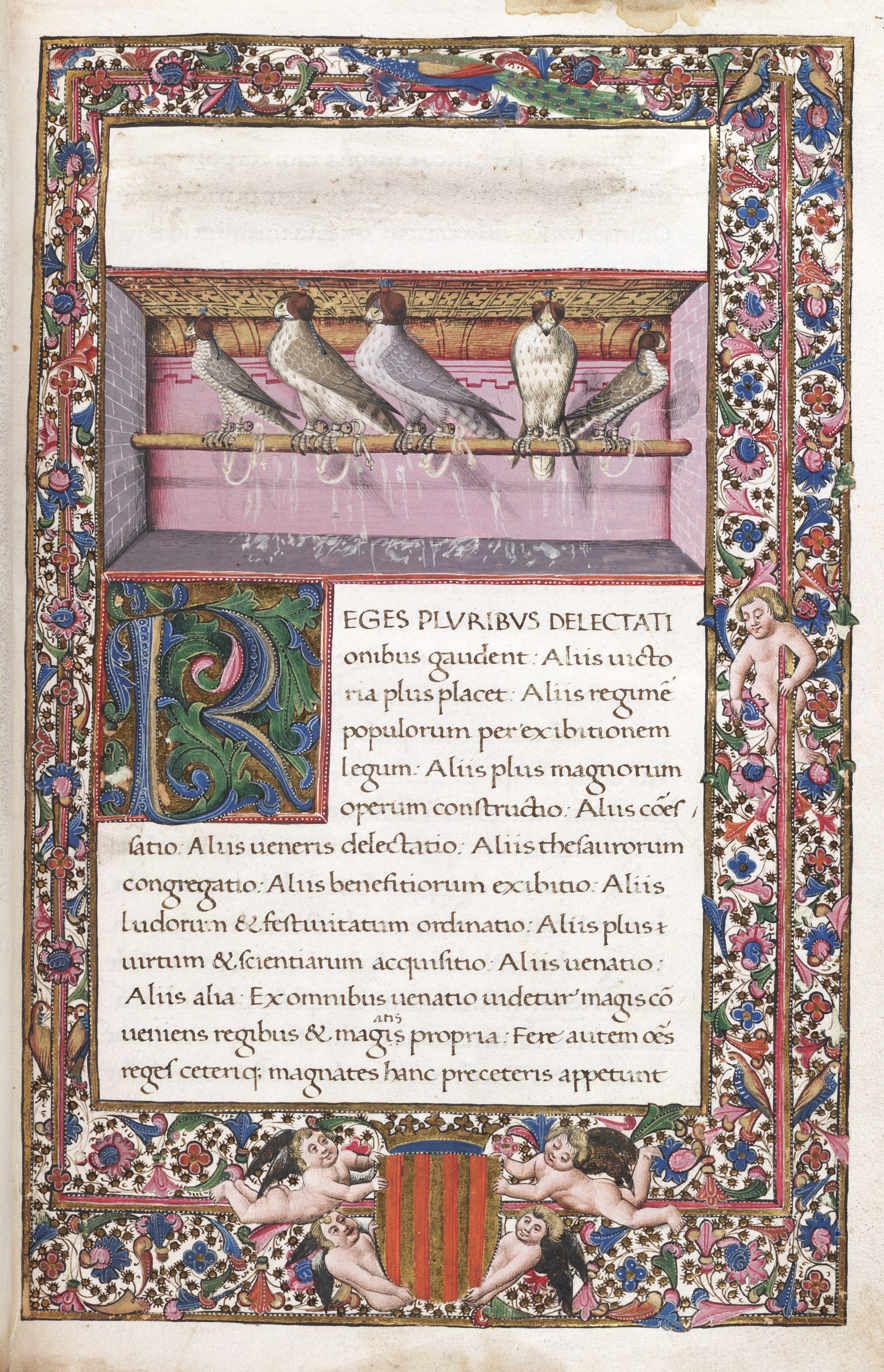
Page from a Latin translation in Yale University

Moamyn (or Moamin) was the name given in medieval Europe to an Arabic author of a five-chapter treatise on falconry, important for early Europeans, which was most popular as translated by Theodore of Antioch under the title De scientia venandi per aves in 1240–1241. It also contained a chapter on hunting with dogs and chapters on other related subjects such as diseases of birds. There are about 27 Latin manuscript versions of Moamyn's work with two of them being illustrated throughout, with a well-known copy held in Vienna.

== Identity ==
The true identity of Moamyn is a mystery. The name by which he was known in the medieval west is most likely the result of a corruption or simplification of the true pronunciation of the Arabic name. Based on this, among other reasons, François Viré has suggested that he is in fact Hunayn ibn Ishaq (809–873), physician of the Abbasid Caliphate. Thus, Moamyn would be the deformation of the original Arabic Hunayn. However, there are other theories.

== Origins ==
The Kitāb al-mutawakkilī of the mid-ninth century was thought to be Moamyn's treatise on falconry in the original Arabic, but was discovered not to be in the 1980s. It was translated into Castilian in 1252 under the title Libro de los animales que caçan.

Moamyn's work is largely based on the Kitāb al-ṭuyūr (كتاب الطيور), the Book of Birds (also known as the Kitāb dawari at-tayr, the Book of flight cycles(patterns) of Birds), a more extensive work by al-Ghiṭrīf ibn Qudāmah al-Ghassānī from the early ninth century.

== Translations ==
A Franco-Italian translation from the Latin was by Daniel Deloc da Cremona (1249–1272), a Tuscan translation by Moroello (early 14th century) and a Neapolitan translation by Iammarco Cinico (1482–1489). A modern Italian translation was by Sebastiano Antonio de Marinis in the 16th century.
