= Bartholomew of Messina =

Start of Bartholomew's translation of the Problemata in a 14th-century English manuscript. The red dragon is probably drawn in reference to dragon's blood.

Bartholomew of Messina was a Sicilian scholar who worked as a translator of Greek into Latin at the court of King Manfred of Sicily (r. 1258–1266).

== Life ==
Almost nothing is known about Bartholomew's life beyond what can be deduced from the formulaic incipit that appears at the start of most of his translations: "Here begins the book ___, translated from Greek into Latin by master Bartholomew of Messina at the court of the most illustrious Manfred, most serene king of Sicily, lover of science, by his command." Three translations ascribed to Bartholomew do not have this formula, which may indicate that they were not made for Manfred.

In a letter to the masters of the University of Paris, Manfred refers to his translators without naming them. Other than Bartholomew, only Stephen of Messina can be certainly associated with his court. Other translators who may have worked for Manfred include William of Luna, Joannes de Dumpno and the anonymous translator of the Tacuinum sanitatis. It has been suggested, on account of his prominence among the identifiable translators of Manfred, that he was the head of the translation school. For the same reason, a reference in Roger Bacon to "the translator of Manfred" is usually taken to refer to Bartholomew.

== Works ==
Bartholomew's translations are highly literal, sometimes to the point that his Latin makes little sense. Although this led Roger Bacon to criticize his translations, it has value to modern scholars critically editing the often imperfectly preserved Greek texts. Bartholomew's translation of the De signis of Theophrastus of Eresus is valuable because it is older than the oldest extant Greek manuscript. It survives in ten manuscripts and was printed four times in the sixteenth century. Likewise, his translation of Theophrastus's De principiis depends on a lost Greek text tradition and is useful for a reconstruction of the Greek text. It is preserved in one manuscript. Dimitri Gutas calls Bartholomew a "literal and slavish translator".

Bartholomew's translation of the Hieroclean treatise of the Hippiatrica is preserved in nine manuscript. It was translated into Sicilian. It is not clear if he worked from an independent text of Hierocles' treatise or if he excerpted from the Hippiatrica. His arrangement of chapters appears to be a novelty.

== List of translations ==
The following works were translated by Bartholomew for Manfred, except where noted:

- Aristotle
  - Rhetorica
  - De partibus animalium
- (Pseudo-)Hippocrates
  - De natura hominis
  - De natura puerorum
- Pseudo-Aristotle
  - Problemata physica
  - De mirabilibus auscultationibus
  - Physiognomonica
  - De mundo
  - De coloribus
  - Magna moralia
- (Pseudo-)Hierocles
  - part of the Hippiatrica
- Theophrastus of Eresus
  - De signis
  - De principiis

== Bibliography ==
- Beullens, Pieter (2014). "Facilius sit Nili caput invenire: Towards an Attribution and Reconstruction of the Aristotelian Treatise De Inundatione Nili". In Pieter De Leemans (ed.). Translating at the Court: Bartholomew of Messina and Cultural Life at the Court of Manfred of Sicily. Leuven University Press. pp. 303–329.
- Beullens, Pieter (2020). A Methodological Approach to Anonymously Transmitted Medieval Translations of Philosophical and Scientific Texts: The Case of Bartholomew of Messina (PhD dissertation). KU Leuven.
- Beullens, Pieter (2022). "Why did Latin Translators Translate from the Greek in the Thirteenth Century and Later?". In Dimitri Gutas (ed.). Why Translate Science? Documents from Antiquity to the 16th Century in the Historical West (Bactria to the Atlantic) (Thesis). Brill. pp. 525–543.
- De Leemans, Pieter (2014). "Bartholomew of Messina, Translator at the Court of Manfred, King of Sicily". In Pieter De Leemans (ed.). Translating at the Court: Bartholomew of Messina and Cultural Life at the Court of Manfred of Sicily. Leuven University Press. pp. xi–xxx.
- Gutas, Dimitri, ed. (2010). Theophrastus: On First Principles (Known as His Metaphysics). Brill.
- Impellizzeri, Salvatore (1964). "Bartolomeo da Messina". Dizionario Biografico degli Italiani, Volume 6: Baratteri–Bartolozzi (in Italian). Rome: Istituto dell'Enciclopedia Italiana. ISBN 978-8-81200032-6.
- McCabe, Anne (2007). A Byzantine Encyclopaedia of Horse Medicine: The Sources, Compilation, and Transmission of the Hippiatrica. Oxford University Press.
- Sider, David; Brunschön, Carl Wolfram, eds. (2007). Theophrastus of Ereus: On Weather Signs. Brill.
