= The Works of Aristotle =

The Works of Aristotle may refer to:

- Works of Aristotle
- Aristotle's Masterpiece
