= Problems (Aristotle) =

Philosophical work, possibly by Aristotle

Problems (Greek: Προβλήματα; Latin: Problemata) is an Aristotelian or possibly pseudo-Aristotelian collection of questions about the world and answers to them. The collection, gradually assembled by the peripatetic school, reached its final form anywhere between the third century BC and the 6th century AD. The work is divided by topic into 38 sections, and the whole contains almost 900 problems.

Later writers to compose question-and-answer works in imitation of Problems include Plutarch, Alexander of Aphrodisias, and Cassius Iatrosophista. The medieval and Renaissance commentators of Aristotle's Problemata include Pietro d'Abano (whose Expositio of 1310 was reprinted in a number of early editions), Giulio Guastavini, Ludovico Settala and Marcantonio Zimara.

This late-medieval compilation was translated into English and first published in London by Arnold Hatfield in 1595; the text was later incorporated into the popular sex manual and a midwifery book, Aristotle's Masterpiece.

== See also ==
- Corpus Aristotelicum
