= Paradies Monastery (Switzerland) =

Former monastery in Thurgau, Switzerland

- Kloster Paradies
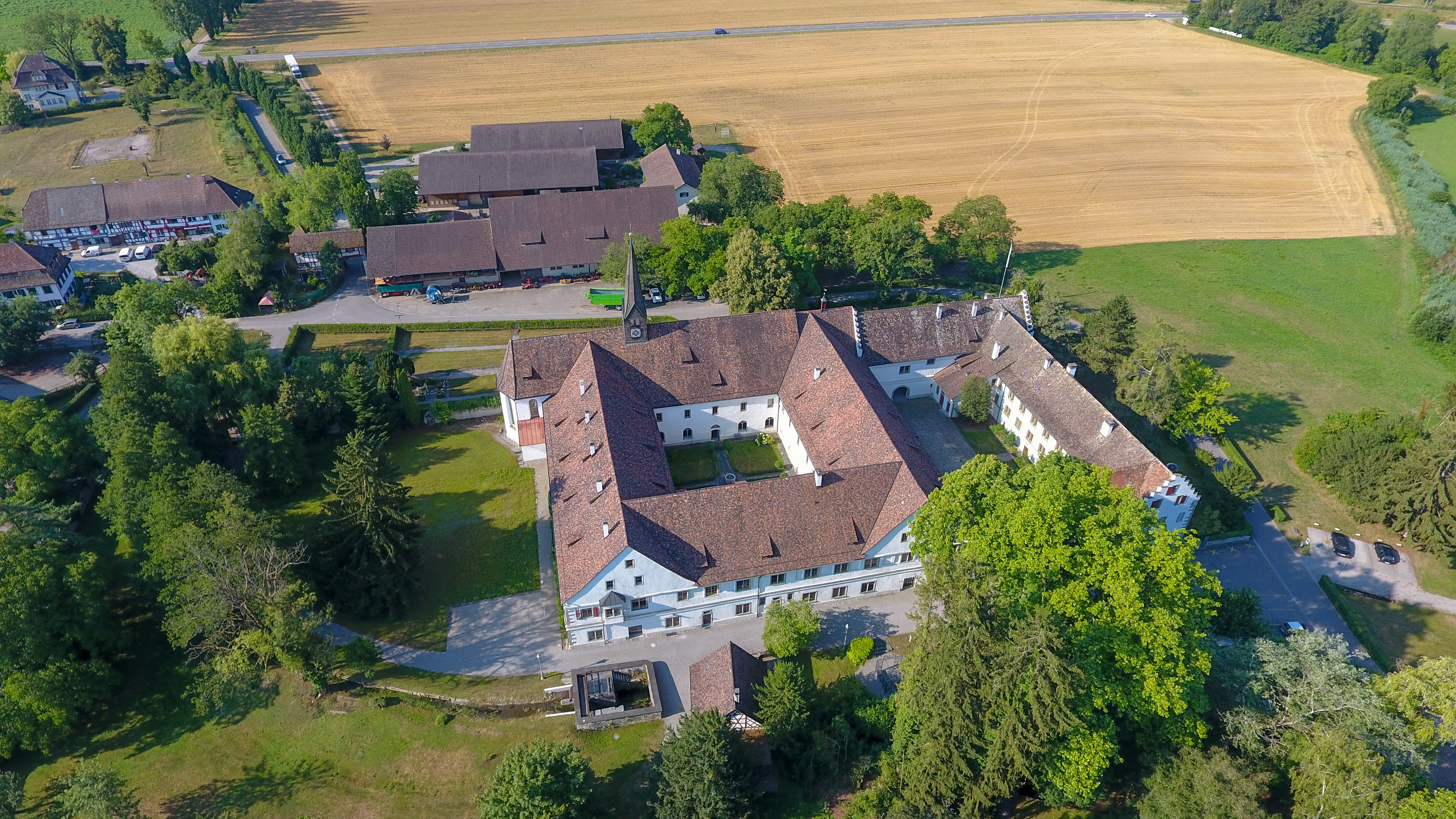
- The former monastery from the air, 2018
- Interactive map of Paradies Monastery

Monastery information
- Order: Poor Clares
- Established: 1253
- Disestablished: 1836
- Diocese: Constance (until 1815), Basel (from 1829)

Site
- Location: Schlatt, Thurgau, Switzerland
- Coordinates: 47.6841°N 8.67637°E

Paradies Monastery (German: Kloster Paradies) is a former monastery of Poor Clares in the municipality of Schlatt in the canton of Thurgau, Switzerland. It lies on the south bank of the Rhine, 4 km (2.5 mi) upstream of Schaffhausen. Until 1815 it belonged to the Diocese of Constance and from 1829 to the Diocese of Basel. It was dissolved in 1836.

== History ==
Paradies is first mentioned in 1253, as conventui de Paradyso. Before the monastery was founded, the village of Schwarzach (recorded in 876 as Swarza) and a church dedicated to St. Peter stood on the site. In 1253 Count Hartmann IV of Kyburg gave property at Lohn, Löhningen and Schwarzach, together with its church patronage (advowson), to the Poor Clares of St. Damian in Constance. Because the transfer of the property was apparently disputed, the endowment was renewed at the end of 1257, and the nuns bought the property of the village of Schwarzach from Friedrich von Randenburg for 115 marks of silver, on condition that they build a monastery there. In 1310 the church of St. Peter was incorporated into the monastery, and the village was absorbed by the monastery.

In 1330 Paradies acquired a house in the town of Schaffhausen, thereby entering into the town's Burgrecht (a treaty of co-citizenship), and it gradually came under the town's administration. During the Reformation the town of Schaffhausen dissolved the monastery. In 1574 the Federal Diet divided its rights and property: Schaffhausen was compensated with Lohn, among other things, and Paradies was attached to the town court of Diessenhofen. In 1578 the five Catholic cantons re-established the monastery, and in 1587 it was rebuilt after a fire. In 1799 Paradies suffered considerable losses from war damage and requisitions.

From 1804 to 1836 the canton of Thurgau had the monasteries of Paradies and St. Katharinental administered jointly. After the dissolution of the monastery it handed the church over to the Catholic parish of Paradies in 1838, and it had the real estate auctioned off. In 1918 Georg Fischer AG acquired the monastery buildings. A foundation set up by the company in 1944 has built up the Iron Library (Eisenbibliothek) there since 1948. The monastery church, remodeled in the Baroque style in 1726, was fully restored in 2001–2002.

== Bibliography ==
- K. Schib, Geschichte des Klosters Paradies, 1951
- Helvetia Sacra, V/1, pp. 587–600
- B. Ott, "Die Grundherrschaft des Klosters Paradies um 1330/1350", in Schaffhauser Beiträge zur Geschichte 60, 1983, pp. 11–26
- Die Kunstdenkmäler des Kantons Thurgau, 5, 1992, pp. 318–401
- Ein Blick ins Paradies, 2003, pp. 11–75
- Helvetia Franciscana 32, 2003, pp. 9–33, 149–158

=== Archives ===
- Pfarrarchiv Paradies (parish archives)
- Staatsarchiv Schaffhausen
- Staatsarchiv Thurgau, Frauenfeld
- Stiftsarchiv Mehrerau
