= On Marvellous Things Heard =

Work traditionally ascribed to Aristotle

Page from a miscellany of Greek philosophy copied by Nikolaos Sekoundinos at Florence in 1441. This page contains extracts from The Situations and Names of Winds and On Marvellous Things Heard.

On Marvellous Things Heard (Ancient Greek: Περὶ θαυμασίων ἀκουσμάτων; Latin: De mirabilibus auscultationibus), often called Mirabilia, is a collection of thematically arranged anecdotes formerly attributed to Aristotle. The material included in the collection mainly deals with the natural world (e.g., plants, animals, minerals, weather, geography). The work consists of 178 chapters and is an example of the paradoxography genre of literature.

According to the revised Oxford translation of The Complete Works of Aristotle this treatise's "spuriousness has never been seriously contested". It was denied by Desiderius Erasmus in his edition of the Corpus Aristotelicum in 1531.

On Marvellous Things Heard was translated into Latin three times during the Middle Ages: first by Bartolomeo da Messina in the 13th century, then in the 14th century by Leontius Pilatus and finally in the 15th century by the humanist Antonio Beccaria. The first edition of the Greek text was an incunabulum printed by Aldo Manuzio in 1497. Four Latin translations appeared in the 16th century based on printed editions (two anonymous, two by Domenico Montesoro and Natale Conti).
