= De Proprietatibus Elementorum =

Medieval Arabic treatise on geology

De Proprietatibus Elementorum (English: On the Properties of the Elements) is a Medieval Arabic treatise on geology. It is also known as De Causis Proprietatum Elementorum, De Proprietatibus Elementorum et Planetarum or simply De Elementis. It was probably written in the ninth or tenth century. The author of the work claimed to be Aristotle, but eventually it was determined that it was an original work by an Arab author. Consequently, the work is now attributed to a Pseudo-Aristotle.

== History ==
The work did not have a lasting impact on science in the medieval Islamic world, but it became important in Europe after it was translated to Latin by Gerard of Cremona in the twelfth century. By the thirteenth century, it had become one of the three main sources for medieval knowledge on geology, together with Aristotle's Meteorology and Avicenna's De Mineralibus. These three treatises were an important influence on the study of geology by Albertus Magnus. When scholars started to recognize during the Renaissance that De Proprietatibus Elementorum was not written by Aristotle, it was removed from the academic curriculum.

== Content ==
In his work Meteorology, Aristotle explained that the earth as an element was cold and dry. He did not cover phenomena related to terrestrial heat. De Proprietatibus Elementorum filled this lacuna with its inquiry on volcanoes and hot springs. According to the work large quantities of sulfur in the interior of a mountain caused volcanic eruptions. Winds and waters present at the foot of the mountain could set fire to this sulfur, particularly in the case of Mount Etna.

Its explanation of hot springs seems to have been taken by an unknown work from Theophrastus. Theophrastus or the pseudo-Aristotle first dismisses several explanations provided by Democritus, Mileus and Rentifolus, the latter two possibly Thales and Xenophanes. The opinion of the author follows, that water gets heated by beds of sulfur before it emerges on the surface. Naphtha is associated with this process, because together with sulfur it forms a kind of burner to transport fuel to the fire.

== Sources ==
- Peters, Francis E. (1968). Aristoteles Arabus: The Oriental Translations and Commentaries of the Aristotelian Corpus. Leiden: E. J. Brill.
- Crombie, Alistair Cameron (1995). The History of Science from Augustine to Galileo. Mineola, New York: Dover Publications. ISBN 9780486288505.
- Vermij, Rienk (1998). "Subterranean Fire. Changing Theories of the Earth during the Renaissance". Early Science and Medicine. 3 (4): 323–347. doi:10.1163/157338298X00095. JSTOR 4130115. PMID 11620558.
