= Iron Library =

Special library in Thurgau, Switzerland

Coordinates: 47.684444°N 8.675833°E

Iron Library Eisenbibliothek
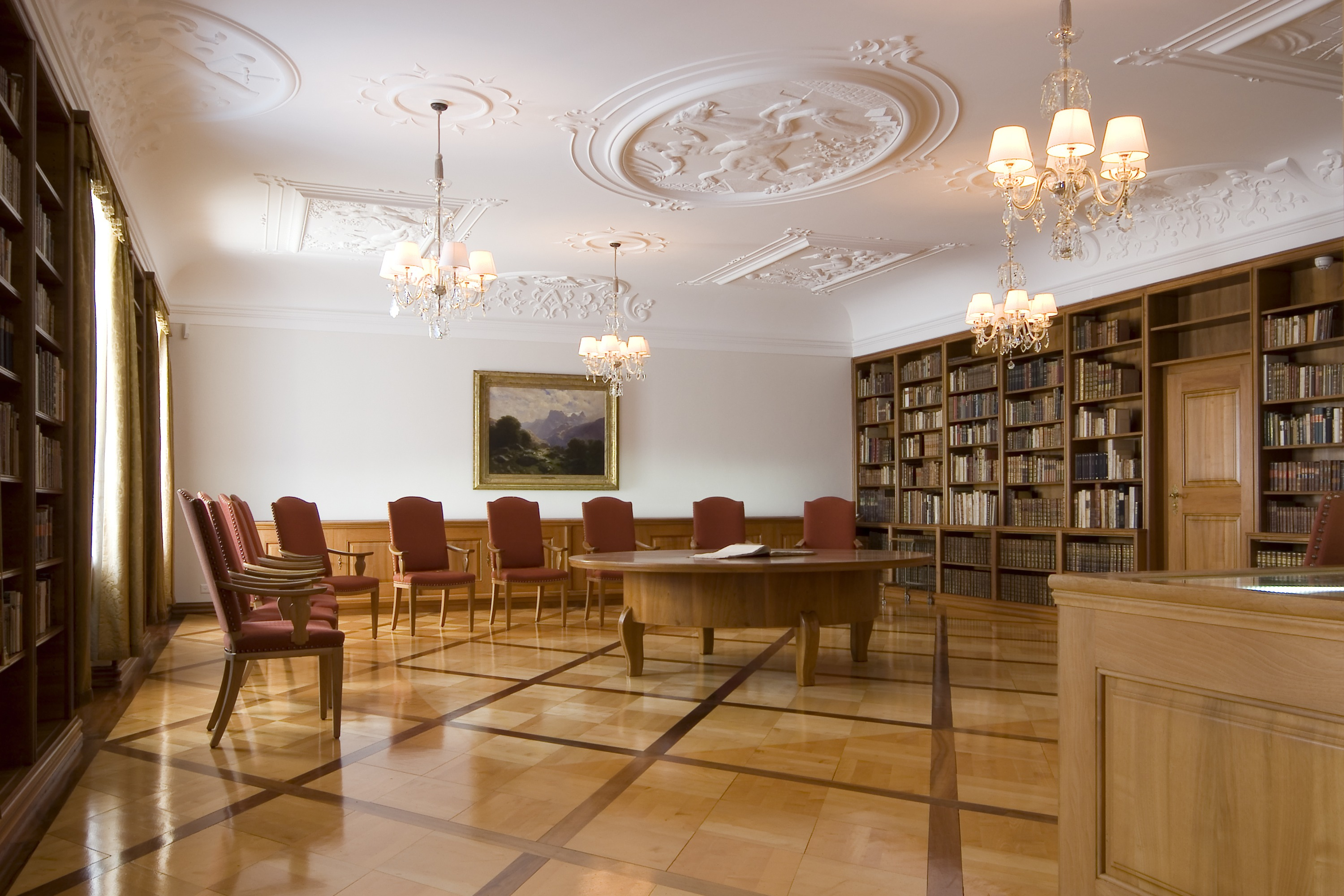
- Location: Altparadies, Schlatt, Thurgau, Switzerland
- Type: Special, scientific and technical library
- Established: 1948

Collection
- Size: 50,000 items

Other information
- Director: Franziska Eggimann
- Website: www.eisenbibliothek.ch

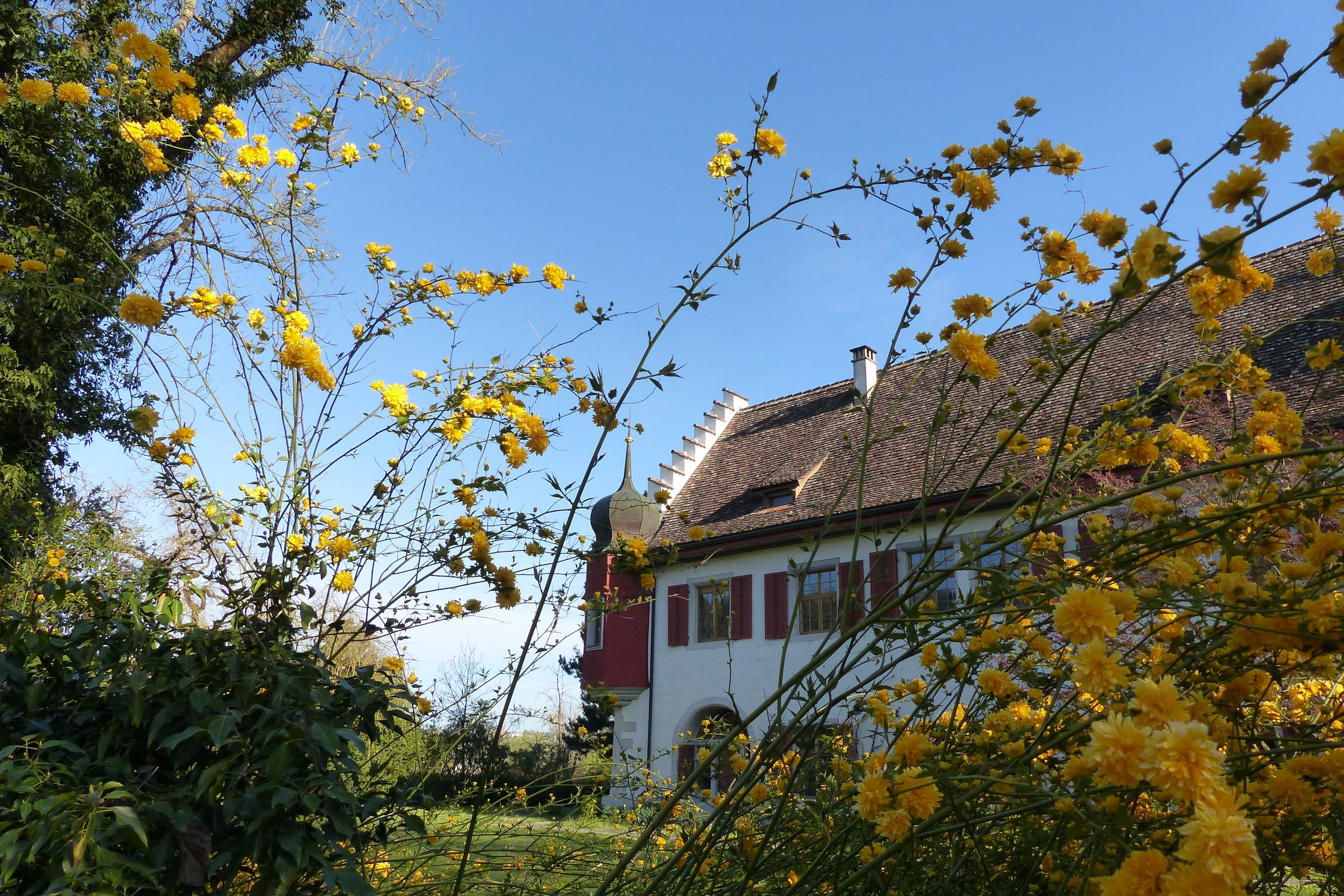
Iron Library, monastery of Paradies

The Iron Library (German Eisenbibliothek) is a special, scientific and technical library in Schlatt, Thurgau in Switzerland. Its main focuses are manuscripts, books and journals on iron, metallurgy, the history of science, and plastics.

== History ==
The Iron Library Foundation was established on 31 December 1948, at the initiative of Ernst Müller (1885–1957). He had been director of Georg Fischer AG (GF). The Iron Library itself was opened in 1952 in the west wing of the Klostergut Paradies in Schlatt, Thurgau. In this year the company Georg Fischer celebrated the 150th anniversary. The Klostergut Paradies is the former Poor Clares convent of Paradies, which had been purchased by Georg Fischer in 1918.

In 2014 the Iron Library set out to expand its holdings on the history of plastics and polymer science. To this end it became a member of the Plastics Historical Society in London and the German Plastics Historical Society (Deutsche Gesellschaft für Kunststoffgeschichte) in Bayreuth. In 2025 the Huntsman Corporation's Advanced Material division in Basel donated its 4000 volume research library to the Iron Library's holdings.

== Collection focuses ==
Iron Library collects media from the following fields:

- Iron and metallurgy
- Plastics
- History of technology and natural sciences
- History of industry
- History of Georg Fischer AG

== Manuscripts and rare books ==
The Iron Library's collections contain rare original holdings of scientific and cultural-historical relevance. The collections include:

- The "Aristoteles-Albertus-Magnus-manuscript" was written in the second half of 13th century. Its main parts are the Pseudo-Aristotelian treatise Secretis secretorum, De mineralibus by Aristoteles and De natura loci by Albertus Magnus.
- Bartholomaeus Anglicus: De proprietatibus rerum. Printed by Pierre Hongre in Lyons, 1482.
- Albertus Magnus: De natura locorum. Printed in Strasbourg, 1515.
- Wok Pniowsky von Eulenberg: Ayn liblichs piechel, a manuscript written in 1526.
- Georgius Agricola: De re metallica. Printed in Basel by Froben, 1556.
- Isaac Newton: Philosophiae Naturalis Principia Mathematica. Printed in London, 1687, and which was once in the libraries of Jan Evangelista Purkinjě and later Ernst Mach.
- Giuseppe Valadier: Disegni, e spiegazione della Fonderia principio, e termine della Campana di S. Pietro, an illustrated manuscript written and painted in 1786.
- Christian von Mechel: Die eiserne Hand des tapferen deutschen Ritters Götz von Berlichingen. The book was printed in 1815 and describes the iron hand of Götz von Berlichingen, which was created in 1530.
- Gustave Eiffel: La tour de trois cents mètres. (Eiffel Tower) Paris, 1900.
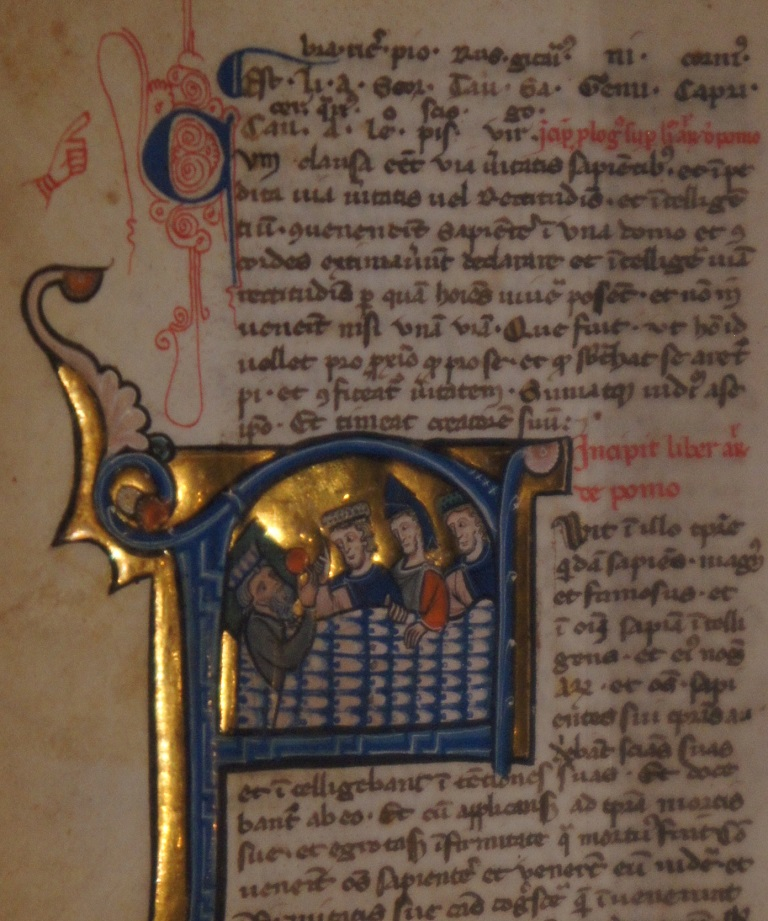
Aristoteles and his pupils, 13th century manuscript of The Book of the Apple

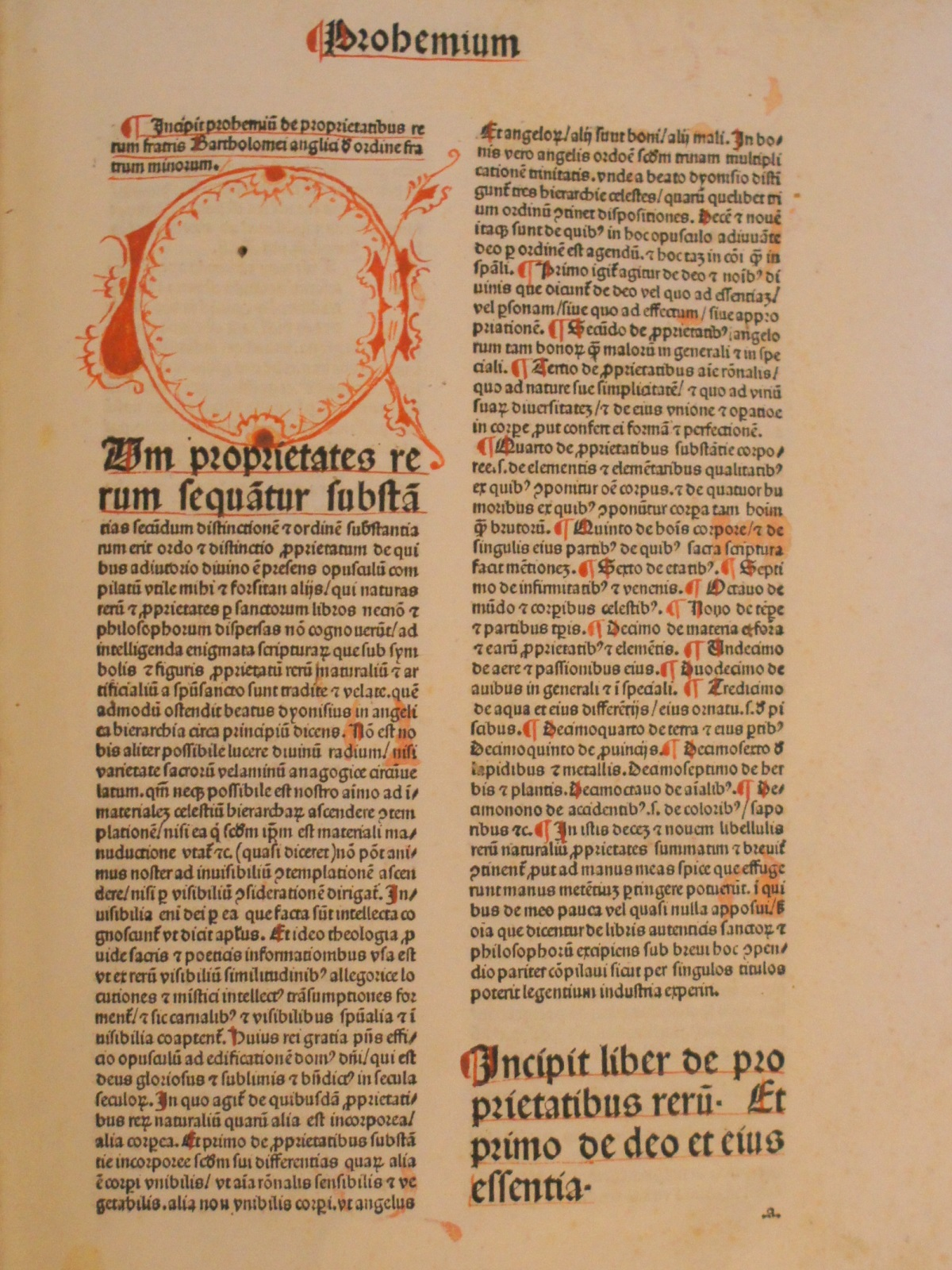
De proprietatibus rerum, 1482

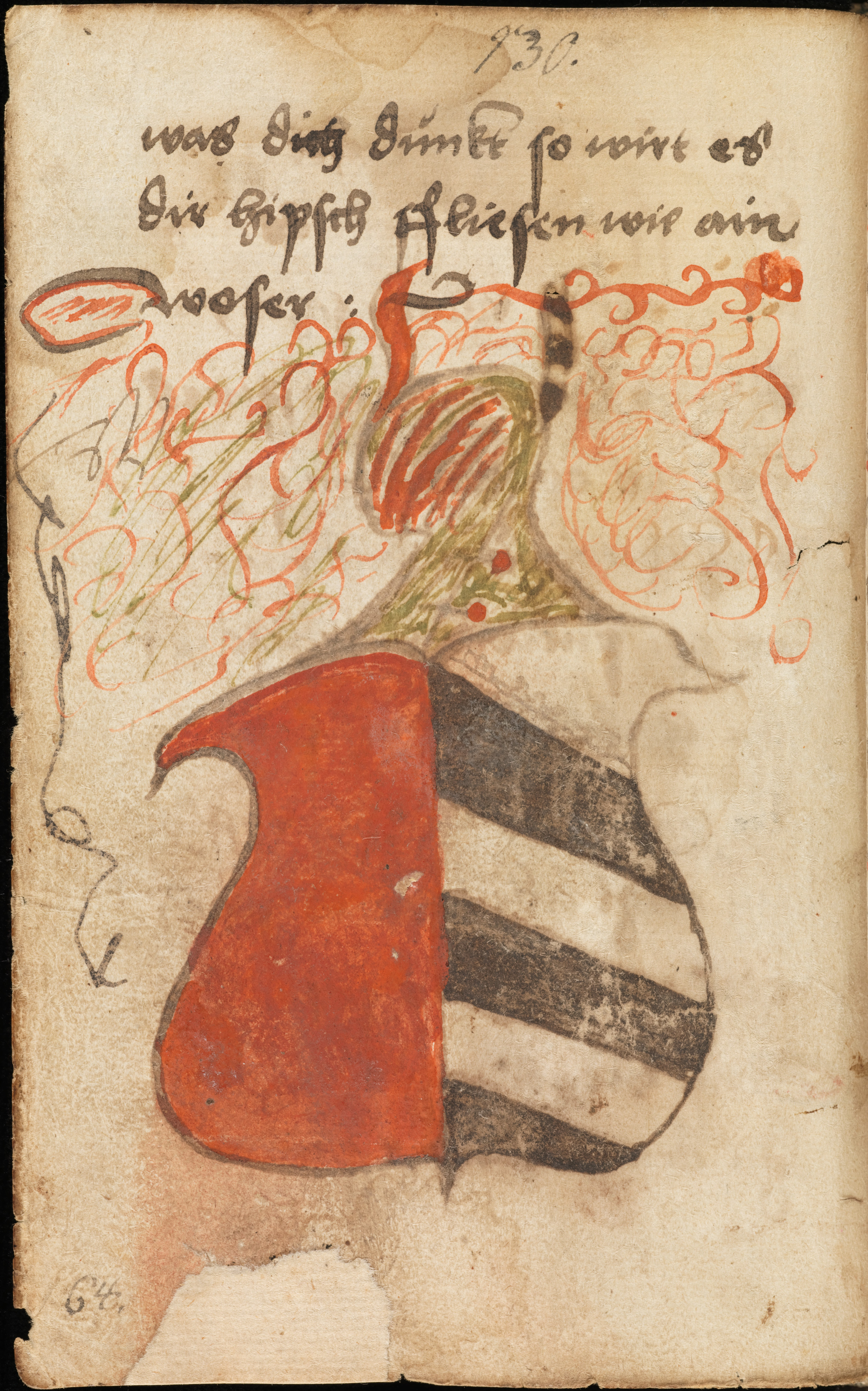
Ayn liblichs piechel, 1526

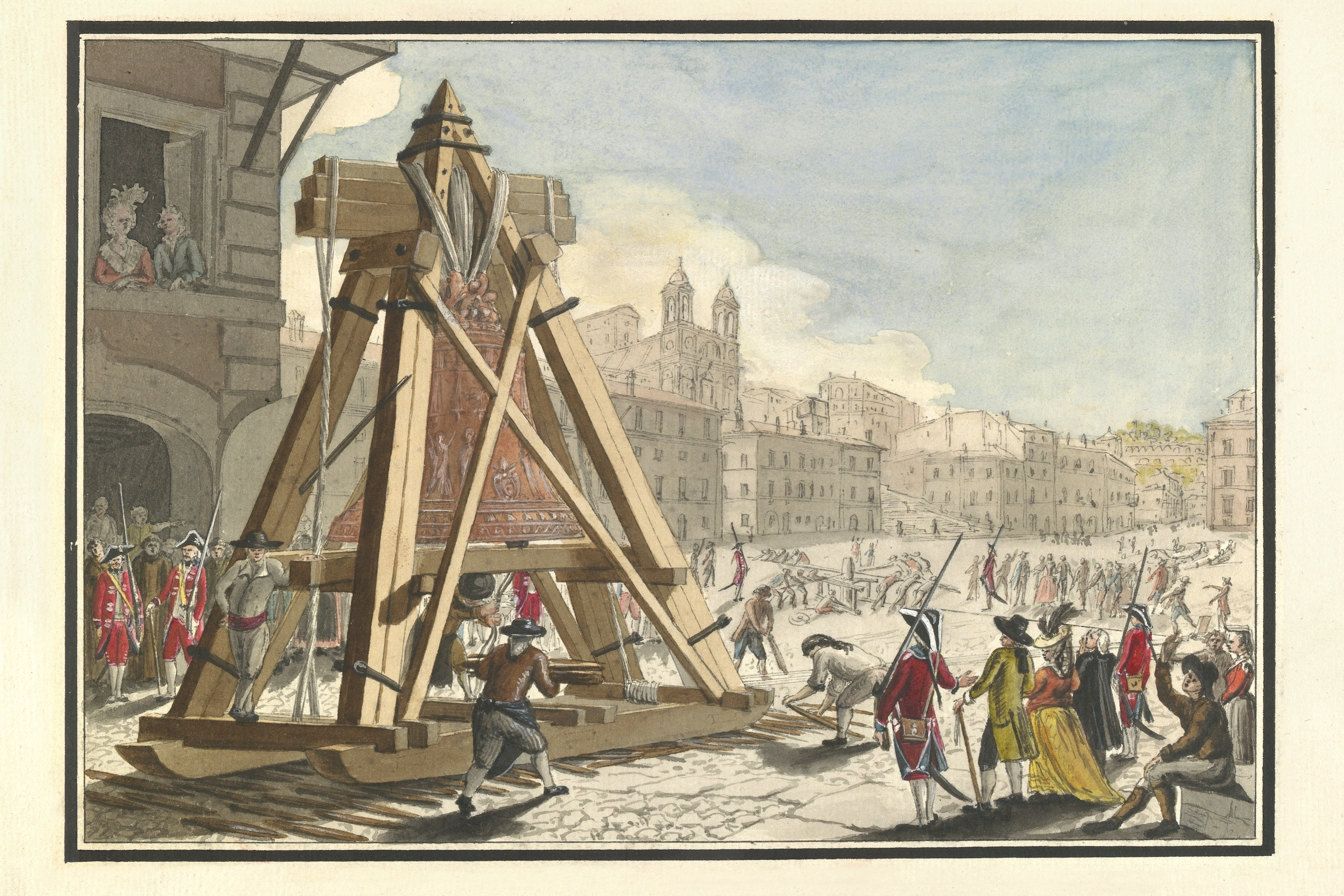
Illustration by Giuseppe Valadier, 1786

== Georg Fischer Corporate Archives ==
The Iron Library forms a unitary institution together with the Corporate Archives of Georg Fischer AG. The older holdings of the archives are also to be found on the premises of the Paradies convent.

== Cultural property and heritage site of significance ==
The Iron Library is listed as Swiss cultural property of regional significance.

The archives of Georg Fischer and the former Poor Clares convent of Paradies in Altparadies are listed as Swiss heritage sites of national significance. The entire Paradies monastery is included in the Inventory of Swiss Heritage Sites.

== Literature ==
- Annual Report 2019. Iron Library Foundation and Corporate Archives of Georg Fischer Ltd. Romanshorn 2020. ISSN 2297-8496.
