= Pseudo-Aristotle =

Cognomen for authors of works falsely attributed to Aristotle

Pseudo-Aristotle is a general cognomen for authors of philosophical or medical treatises who attributed their works to the Greek philosopher Aristotle, or whose work was later attributed to him by others. Such falsely attributed works are known as pseudepigrapha. The term Corpus Aristotelicum covers both the authentic and spurious works of Aristotle.

== History ==
The first Pseudo-Aristotelian works were produced by the members of the Peripatetic school, which was founded by Aristotle. However, many more works were written much later, during the Middle Ages. Because Aristotle had produced so many works on such a variety of subjects, it was possible for writers in many different contexts—notably medieval Europeans, North Africans and Arabs—to write a work and ascribe it to Aristotle. Attaching his name to such a work guaranteed it a certain amount of respect and acceptance, since Aristotle was regarded as one of the most authoritative ancient writers for the learned men of both Christian Europe and the Muslim Arab lands. It is generally not clear whether the attribution to Aristotle of a later work was done by its own author or by others who sought to popularize such works by using his name.

In the Middle Ages, more than a hundred Pseudo-Aristotelian works were in circulation. These can be separated into three groups based on the original language used for the work, namely Latin, Greek or Arabic. The category of Latin works is the smallest, while the Arabic works are most numerous. Many Arabic works were translated to Latin in the Middle Ages. The majority of these cover occult subjects, such as alchemy, astrology, chiromancy and physiognomy. Others treated Greek philosophical subjects, more often the Platonic and neoplatonic schools rather than the thought of Aristotle. The Arabic Secretum Secretorum was by far the most popular Pseudo-Aristotelian work and was even more widely diffused than any of the authentic works of Aristotle.

The release of Pseudo-Aristotelian works continued for long after the Middle Ages. Aristotle's Masterpiece was a sex manual which published first in 1684 and became very popular in England. It was still being sold in the early twentieth century and was probably the most widely reprinted book on a medical subject in the eighteenth and early nineteenth century.

== Notable works ==
- Aristotle's Masterpiece (1684)
- De Proprietatibus Elementorum (9th or 10th century)
- Liber de Causis
- On Marvellous Things Heard
- On the Universe (De Mundo, 4th or 3rd century BC)
- Rhetoric to Alexander
- Secretum Secretorum
- The Book of the Apple
- The Theology of Aristotle
- Physiognomonics (circa 300 BCE)
- On Melissus, Xenophanes, and Gorgias
- Mechanics

== Sources ==
- Alwishah, Ahmed; Hayes, Josh (2015). Aristotle and the Arabic Tradition. ISBN 1107101735. Cambridge University Press.
- Bullough, Vern L. (1973). "An Early American Sex Manual, or, Aristotle Who?". Early American Literature. 7 (3): 236–246. JSTOR 25070583.
- Glick, Thomas; Livesey, Steven J.; Wallis, Faith, eds. (2005). Medieval Science, Technology, and Medicine: An Encyclopedia. New York City, New York: Routledge. ISBN 978-0-415-96930-7.
- Kieckhefer, Richard (2000). Magic in the Middle Ages. Cambridge, United Kingdom: Cambridge University Press. ISBN 978-0-521-78576-1.
- Charles B. Schmitt, Dilwyn Knox (Eds.): Pseudo-Aristoteles Latinus. A Guide to Latin works falsely attributed to Aristotle before 1500. London: The Warburg Institute, 1985, ISBN 0-85481-066-8 (Warburg Institute Surveys and Texts 12)
