= The Book of the Apple =

Medieval neoplatonic Arabic work of unknown authorship

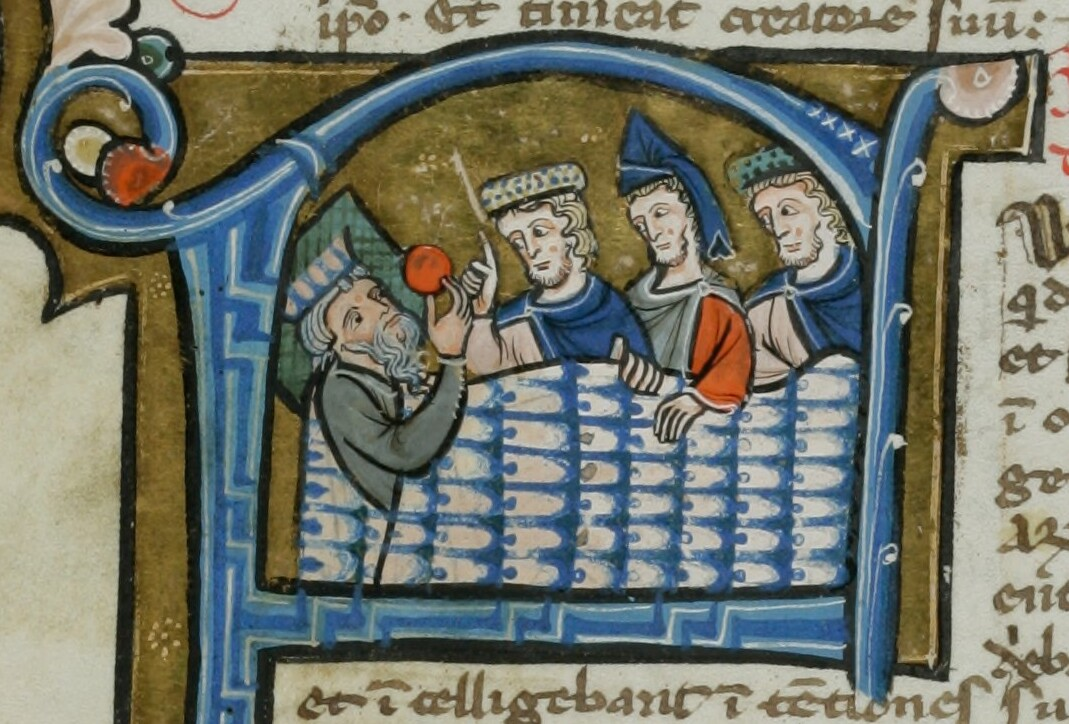
Aristotle holding an apple, as shown in a XIII century manuscript of The Book of the Apple (Iron Library Mss 20)

The Book of the Apple (Arabic: Risālat al-Tuffāha; Latin: Tractatus de pomo et morte incliti principis philosophorum Aristotelis) was a medieval neoplatonic Arabic work of unknown authorship. It was spuriously ascribed to Aristotle; its date of composition is unknown although it predates the 10th century CE. Its name comes from the fact that the central dialogue is that of Aristotle, who lectures about immortality as he is dying, periodically revived and energized by smelling an apple. Despite its spuriousness, it was seriously discussed in the Encyclopedia of the Brethren of Purity. It was also translated from Arabic into Hebrew by Abraham ben Hasdai.
