= Aristotle's Masterpiece =

1684 sex manual book

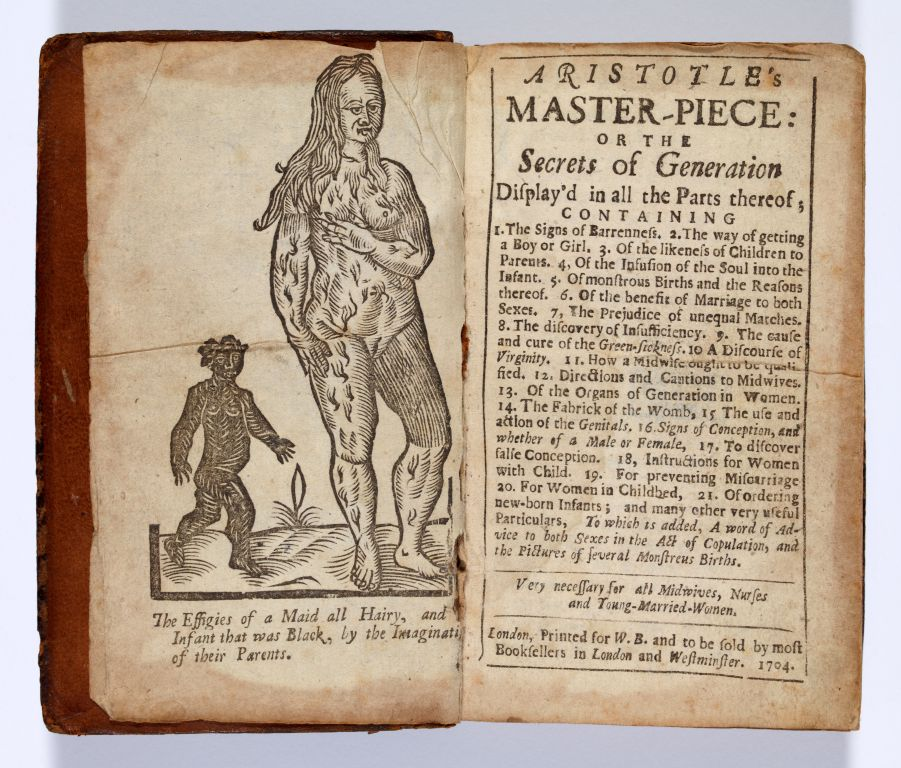
Frontispiece and contents page from 1704 edition of Aristotle's Masterpiece

Aristotle's Masterpiece, also known as The Works of Aristotle, the Famous Philosopher, is a sex manual and a midwifery book that was popular in England from the early modern period through to the nineteenth century. It was first published in 1684 and written by an unknown author who falsely claimed to be Aristotle. As a consequence the author is now described as a Pseudo-Aristotle, the collective name for unidentified authors who masqueraded as Aristotle. Some claim that the book was banned in Britain until the 1960s, although there was no provision in the UK for "banning" books as such. However, reputable publishers and booksellers might have been cautious about selling Aristotle's Masterpiece, at least in the wake of the 1857 Obscene Publications Act.

== Content ==
Although many people in the twenty-first century might think of early modern readers as prudish, Aristotle’s Masterpiece was not only a book on midwifery but also a sex manual. It therefore gave frank explanations of topics ranging from childbirth to "the purpose, pleasures, and particulars of sex." Also, unlike many later texts, it acknowledged women’s sexual pleasure – something that people often downplayed in later centuries after male midwives rose in popularity and open conversations about sex became less common.

=== Versions ===
Through the seventeenth and eighteenth centuries, the work was published in three different versions in 9, 20 and 78 editions respectively. The first version borrowed most of its content from two earlier works, the Secret Miracles of Nature by Levinus Lemnius and the anonymous Complete Midwives Practice Enlarged. The latter had been a successful work by itself, coming second only to Nicholas Culpeper's Directory for Midwives in number of seventeenth century editions.

A second version was released by publisher Benjamin Harris in 1697. The first half contained most of the first version and the second half was borrowed from John Sadler's A Sick Women's Private Looking-Glas (published in 1636). The third version, published around 1710, was different from the previous versions, but again copied material from other works on the subject. These included the Directory for Midwives, John Pechey's 1698 version of the Compleate Midwive's Practice Enlarged, and other popular books on sex and reproduction available at the time.

The third version was still printed and sold to a general audience in the early twentieth century. It remained unchanged from the eighteenth century editions, because the modern theory on sexuality had not yet been conceived. Because the book was based on the ancient theory of humorism, it provided some outdated information, in particular on the home remedies it prescribed.

The third version is divided into two parts. The first part covers anatomy, sexual intercourse and marriage. The second part was intended for married women and explains pregnancy and midwifery.

The first part starts with a description of the male and female sex organs in the first chapter. The second chapter advocates sexual intercourse in monogamous relationships and warns against polygamy and adultery, because both are forbidden by Christian doctrine. It finishes with an explanation of when the reproductive age begins and ends. The third chapter explores virginity. It correctly states that a torn hymen does not necessarily mean a woman is not a virgin.

The second part continues with the process of fertilisation, pregnancy, and how the sex of the fetus can be determined. The second chapter provides advice on how women can become pregnant. The third chapter describes the progress of pregnancy. Failure of the pregnancy, infertility and its causes are the subject of the fourth chapter. The part ends with a chapter on things women should do and avoid during their pregnancy.

== History ==
After Culpeper's Directory for Midwives was published in 1651, other writers and booksellers sought to emulate its great success. Aristotle's Masterpiece was among the two dozen works in the genre which were published in the following decades. This was in sharp contrast to the three titles which had been published on the subject in the previous century. Aimed at a vernacular audience, Aristotle’s Masterpiece was accessible to a range of readers. As a result, it was probably the most widely reprinted book on a medical subject in the eighteenth and early nineteenth centuries.

=== Reasons for attribution to Aristotle ===
The title of the work was possibly chosen because many people saw Aristotle as a sex expert in early modern England. Another popular pseudo-Aristotelian text which covered sex and reproduction, Aristotle's Problems (1595), was responsible for this reputation. The real Aristotle also wrote works about the reproduction of animals (such as History of Animals and Generation of Animals) and many people considered him an authority on scientific matters in general so “[a]ttributing the work to Aristotle [gave] it a claim to respectability, authority, and ancient pedigree."

=== Publication context ===
Ideas about biology and the human body were very different in 1651 than they are in the twenty-first century. One important figure who shaped ideas of the time was Galen, who developed humoral theory also known as humorism (an ancient theory that bodily fluids controlled health and temperament) or Galenic theory. Many people (including medical practitioners) used this theory to explain a number of maladies and bodily functions, as well as differences between the sexes. Galen explained that, because of the different balances of the humors (blood, phlegm, black bile, and yellow bile), women were generally “colder and wetter” and men were generally “hotter and dryer." Also, medical experts following Galen believed that women’s bodies were the inverse of men’s. They “described the uterus as an inverted penis, and the ovaries as female testicles that remained inside the body because the female lacked sufficient heat to push them out."

Aristotle’s ideas, similar to Galen’s in some respects, were also influential at this time. Aristotle used the male body as the standard. In the Generation of Animals, Aristotle argues that “the female is, as it were, a deformed male.” In the same work, he also explained that “men were superior [to women], and since nature created everything for a purpose – a telos – men must provide the important parts in procreation."

The influence of Galenic and Aristotelian ideas can be seen in many sex manuals and midwifery books from the period, including those that had a direct impact on Aristotle’s Masterpiece. For example, Levinus Lemnius’ text The Secret Miracles of Nature (first published in 1551) states that “a woman’s mind is not so strong as a man’s, nor is she so full of understanding and reason and judgement, and upon every small occasion she casts off the bridle of reason." Similar ideas can be found in the works of women writers as well. One example is Jane Sharpe's 1671 Midwives Book – the only book on midwifery to be published by a woman before the start of the eighteenth century. Sharpe writes that “a woman is not so perfect as a man, because her heat is weaker, but the man can do nothing without the woman to beget children." Yet Sharpe’s book also reflected more contemporary ideas, such as her argument that “shame [is] an impediment to gaining the knowledge that [aids] women in leading healthy reproductive lives.”

Whether despite or because of a belief in women’s inferior status, the practice of midwifery was governed almost entirely by women when Aristotle’s Masterpiece was first published – but this was starting to change. In the past, “[c]hildbirth was a largely female affair” – not even the husband or male physicians were present unless the mother, child, or both were dead or dying. This meant that a male physician’s presence was generally “dreaded” during a birth. Yet “[m]ale medical writers [took] increasing interest in gynecological issues” and their “greater access to learned medicine and Latin texts gave them increasing authority over conditions that afflicted women.” Men also began to write more about obstetrics and they started to develop tools, such as forceps, to help them during deliveries. Although male physicians and “educated urban female midwives […] both read the same books and had the same concepts of anatomy and the birth process,” women were not allowed to use the tools developed to help during births and they were “excluded” from the “dissections and anatomical classes” that improved male physicians’ training. In the seventeenth century, male midwives were popularized among wealthier families in France and, by the eighteenth century, they became popular in England. This change was accomplished through “a process of professionalization in which male practitioners asserted their authority over midwifery by virtue of their formal medical training.” It was also affirmed by an influx of new midwifery texts authored by men.

While male midwives were increasing in popularity, many people were forced to deal with concerns about the propriety of men practicing obstetrics and gynecology. To support this expansion of their role, male medical practitioners worked to downplay any ideas of women’s sexual pleasure within their medical texts. As time went on, new medical texts began to depict only fragmented images of women and their bodies alongside medical information. Similarly, obstetrical machines, which were used to train male midwives, consisted of “a torso with the legs amputated at the knees." This allowed male medical professionals a strong argument against any accusations of sexual impropriety.

Yet twenty-first century historians argue that male midwives’ efforts at increasing their acceptability had some unintended consequences. Because their efforts coincided with the English economy’s transformation "into a commercial and financial powerhouse," scholars such as Mary E. Fissell argue that contemporary popular literature and vernacular medical books, including Aristotle’s Masterpiece, depict “[s]exual relations […] as market relations, with men as active purchasers and women as the passive objects of consumption. The idea of women’s bodies as commodities was therefore reinforced and propagated in a nation increasingly driven by its economy.

== Reception and legacy ==
Aristotle's Masterpiece remained popular into the 19th century – more than a century after its initial publication. Published before concerns were raised about the sexual propriety of male midwives, the text did not change to fit new societal standards. After it was first published, "[i]t quickly became the most popular English-language guide to sexuality, conception, pregnancy, and childbirth." As a result, the book that highlighted sexual pleasure to the extent that it once "proved to be so titillating […] it caused trouble in at least one respectable town" continued to be published alongside more conservative texts for decades.

Additionally, as a book initially published and popularized in England, it was easily able to travel to England's American colonies. Thus, Aristotle's Masterpiece "has the distinction of being one of the few books read by colonial Americans that was still printed and sold to a general audience in the twentieth century."

Lastly, despite any misconceptions of biology and anatomy it contained, the advice Aristotle's Masterpiece provided "was both more accurate and less harmful" than that given in many of its Victorian-era counterparts. Consequently, scholars such as Vern L. Bullough argue that "the writers of Aristotle's Masterpiece were harbingers of a new age of sexual freedom."

The book is mentioned in Evelyn Waugh's 1930 novel Vile Bodies, where customs officers check the protagonist's luggage: "With the help of a printed list (which began 'Aristotle, Works of (Illustrated)') they went through Adam's books, laboriously, one at a time, spelling out the titles." C. S. Lewis refers the book in The Great Divorce (1946), where the narrator says, "However far I went I found only dingy lodging houses, small tobacconists, hoardings from which posters hung in rags, windowless warehouses, good stations without trains, and bookshops of the sort that sell The Works of Aristotle."

== Sources ==
- Bullough, Vern L. (1973). "An Early American Sex Manual, or, Aristotle Who?". Early American Literature. 7 (3): 236–246. JSTOR 25070583.
- Crawford, Katherine (2013). "The Good, The Bad, and the Textual: Approaches to the study of the body and sexuality, 1500-1750". In Toulalan, Sarah; Fisher, Kate (eds.). The Routledge History of Sex and the Body: 1500 to the Present. New York: Routledge. ISBN 9780415472371.
- Doyle, Nora (2018). "The Tyrannical Womb and the Disappearing Mother: The Maternal Body in Medical Literature". Maternal Bodies: Redefining Motherhood in Early America. University of North Carolina Press. pp. 14–51. ISBN 978-1-4696-3718-1. JSTOR 10.5149/9781469637211_doyle.5.
- Fissell, Mary (2017). "Remaking the Maternal Body in England, 1680-1730". Journal of the History of Sexuality. 26. University of Texas Press: 114–139. doi:10.7560/JHS26105. S2CID 152056835.
- Wiesner-Hanks, Merry E. (2008). Women and Gender in Early Modern Europe (Third ed.). Cambridge, New York: Cambridge University Press. ISBN 9780521873727.

== See also ==
History of sex education

Midwifery

Humorism

Pseudo-Aristotle

Medical misogyny

Obscene Publications Act 1857

Wellcome Collection
