= Parts of Animals =

Biological work by Aristotle

Parts of Animals (or On the Parts of Animals; Greek Περὶ ζῴων μορίων; Latin De Partibus Animalium) is one of Aristotle's major texts on biology. It was written around 350 BC. The whole work is roughly a study in animal anatomy and physiology; it aims to provide a scientific understanding of the parts (organs, tissues, fluids, etc.) of animals and asks whether these parts were designed or arose by chance.

== Chronology ==
The treatise consists of four books whose authenticity has not been questioned, although its chronology is disputed. The consensus places it before the Generation of animals and perhaps later to History of animals. There are indications that Aristotle placed this book at the beginning of his biological works.

== Content ==
In the first book, Aristotle lays out his method of thinking when it comes to this subject. In the rest of the books, Aristotle studies the internal and external parts of the blood and non-blood animals, comparing them with human beings, showing the common and the specific.

For Aristotle, the material causes of an organism could not explain all its aspects. To explain phenomena such as the processes an organism or its adaptations to the environment of the organism had to resort to the final causes, teleological explanations of those phenomena. In his Generation of Animals, he explains teleologically reproduction and animal development.

=== Book I ===
In Book I, Aristotle applies his theory of causality to the study of life forms. Here, he proposed the methodology to study organisms, and emphasized the importance of the final cause, design or purpose seeking a teleological explanation in the life sciences. He criticized the dichotomous taxonomy practiced in Plato's Academy. He wrote that animals cannot be correctly classified into separate groups based on the dichotomy of features (e.g. having or not having feathers) due to the fact that some animals fit into multiple categories. He concludes by defending the study of animals as a science as important as that of celestial bodies.

=== Book II ===
In Book II, Aristotle used those principles to study the primordial elements of the nature of which the bodies of animals are composed and the intrinsic conditions that make bodies become what they are. There are three stages of composition in animals. First they start from the combination of the fundamental elements of nature (earth, water, air and fire). These forms homogenous parts, or those that all animals have such as flesh, bone, and sinews. Then those form the body and heterogenous parts, or those unique to animals such as the face, hands, and feet. Each part in this process exists for the sake of the latter being created. Aristotle defines an animal in this book as a being which has sensation and at least some homogenous parts.

In this book he also describes individual parts, fluids, and substances of animals. Blood is seen as being hot, and fibers inside of it cause it to coagulate when spilled from the body. He claims that animals such as bulls and boars have high amounts of fibers in their blood which causes them to be "passionate", or have a short temper, and for their blood to coagulate quicker. When it comes to fat it is divided into two substances, lard and suet. Suet is present in animals with horns, while lard is found in those without. He notes it is beneficial to animals in moderate amounts but can be detrimental when there is too much. He describes bone marrow as taking on the character of the fat. Aristotle states that at the time many believed the brain was marrow, although he believed it to be its own substance. The book continues with Aristotle describing many other parts much as eyelashes, the tongue, and ears.

Aristotle affirmed that every living being consists of two intrinsic parts:

- Primary matter (οὐσία)
- Substantial form (εἶδος)

=== Book III ===
Book III covers many different organs (viscera) that can be found in almost all animals. These include teeth, horns, the neck, windpipe, esophagus, heart, blood vessels, lungs, bladder, kidneys, liver, spleen, and stomach. Aristotle describes the placement and anatomy of these organs throughout different species, as well as the suspected cause for their existence and the differing functions they serve.

=== Book IV ===
Much like the third book, Book IV consists of the description of varying organs found in animals. These include the gallbladder, mesentury, and omentum. This book also covers many of the parts found in "bloodless" animals such as crustaceans, cephelopods, sponges, and insects.

== Translations ==
An Arabic translation of Parts of Animals is included as treatises 11–14 of the Kitāb al-Hayawān.

Michael Scot made a Latin version translated from Arabic, and Pedro Gallego a Latin adaptation (Liber de animalibus) made from both the Arabic and Latin versions.

Multiple English language translations of the text exist. William Ogle translated the book into English (1882). Another English translation exists, translated by William Ross and John Smith, (1912). A Greek-English dual translation exists, written by Arthur Leslie Peck and E.S. Forster, (1937).

The Budé edition is a French translation of Parts of Animals, edited by Pierre Louis.

Paul Gohlke wrote a German translation titled Tierkunde; Teile der Tiere, (1949).

== See also ==
- Generation of Animals
- History of Animals
- History of embryology
