= Albert of Rezzato =

Italian bishop

Albert of Rezzato (or Rizzato, Italian: Alberto da Rezzato or da Reggio) was the bishop of Brescia from 1213 until 1227 and the Latin patriarch of Antioch from 1227 until 1245. He served as podestà of the commune of Brescia in 1216 and administered the diocese from 1227 until 1230. In 1220, he participated in the Fifth Crusade.

Albert was a frequent diplomat in the conflict between emperor and cities in Italy and in that between emperor and barons in the Holy Land. He was sympathetic to the Emperor Frederick II, who valued his intercession highly. After going to Antioch in 1230, he made two trips back to Europe. In 1235, he served as apostolic legate in Lombardy. In 1244–1245, he came to Europe to seek peace in the conflict between emperor and pope in light of the Mongol threat. He died while attending the First Council of Lyon.

== Bishop of Brescia ==
Albert was the provost of the cathedral of Reggio Emilia before he became the bishop of Brescia in May 1213. He attended the Fourth Lateran Council in 1215. In 1216, he was elected podestà of Brescia. As podestà, he immediately sent the army against Count Alberto I di Casaloldo, who had occupied the town of Lonato. On 26 August, he presented the consuls of Brescia with an accord he had negotiated with the podestà of Mantua at Marcaria.

As bishop, Albert took back power from the visdomini. He introduced the Dominicans into Brescia and translated the relics of Santi Faustino e Giovita. In 1218, he was present when Cremona and Milan signed a peace treaty. He joined the Fifth Crusade in the army organized by Henry of Settala, arriving in 1220 after the siege of Damietta. In 1223, he reformed the cathedral chapter. He excommunicated the cathedral provost, Tolomeo, for leading a clerical rebellion. He also deposed the abbot of San Tommaso di Acquanegra. In 1226, he was present at Marcaria for negotiations between the Lombard League and the representatives of the Emperor Frederick II.

== Patriarch of Antioch ==
In 1227, Albert was appointed to the patriarchate of Antioch by Pope Gregory IX, who also named him apostolic legate for the patriarchate. The Dominican Guala de Roniis succeeded him as bishop of Brescia, yet Albert continued to administer the diocese until at least January 1230. Albert arrived Antioch in 1230.

As the patriarchate's income was insufficient for its establishment, Albert was drawn into several disputes over tithes and prebends. He successfully forced the Cistercian abbey of Jubin to pay tithes. In 1237, the pope got involved in a dispute over Albert's removal of Aimery, the archdeacon of Tripoli, so that he could appoint his own chancellor, Hubert, to the position. Albert appears to have taken advantage of the death of Bishop Guy of Tripoli to impose his own men on the vacant diocese. Albert de Robertis, a relative of Albert's, was elected bishop of Tripoli in 1243 and continued the vendetta against Guy's men, even trying to remove the canon Philip of Tripoli, despite the fact that in 1230, the patriarch had requested that Philip, then in Italy serving Pope Gregory, return to Antioch, probably because of his competence in Arabic.

After the accession of Prince Bohemond V in 1233, Albert demanded he do homage to the patriarchate, which he refused. Bohemond later arrested several patriarchal officials, including the castellan of Qusayr. Throughout several disputes, however, Albert refused to excommunicate the prince. He favoured church union and patronized the Franciscans and Dominicans for this reason. During his tenure, the Syriac Orthodox patriarch of Antioch, Ignatius III, made a profession of faith that was accepted as orthodox by the Catholic Church and in turn Catholics in the patriarchate of Antioch were permitted to confess to Syriac priests.

Between 1232 and 1234, Albert worked on behalf of Pope Gregory to end the War of the Lombards and reestablish peace between the Emperor Frederick II and the Ibelins in the Kingdom of Jerusalem. In 1232, he brought Richard Filangieri's peace proposal to the High Court in Acre, escorted by a large guard led by John of Ibelin.

Albert's diplomatic successes in the east were only temporary, but he impressed the pope, who summoned him to Italy for diplomatic work in 1235. He was appointed legate in Lombardy. He investigated allegations of heresy in Piacenza and negotiated with Cremona and the Lombard League. He was preferred by the emperor for another term as legate in 1236, but the pope passed him over.

In 1241, Albert, in his capacity as legate in Antioch, heard a case between Bohemond V and the Knights Hospitaller over the fief of Maraclea. He ruled that underage heir of the fief should decide whether to accept the prince of the Hospital as his lord when he came of age but in the meantime the prince could appoint someone to administer the fief while paying compensation to the Hospital. This decision resolved the conflict for the time being.

In late 1244, concerned about the Mongol threat, Albert went to Europe in advance of the Council of Lyon to visit the emperor, who was at war with the pope. In an encyclical to his fellow European monarchs, Frederick called the patriarch his "special friend and faithful adherent". He sent him to the pope with a highly concessionary peace plan that was nonetheless rejected. In June 1245, Cardinal Ranieri di Viterbo addressed to him a tract attacking Frederick II. Albert attended the Council of Lyon later that month, where he was one of the most pro-imperial churchmen. He died during the council.

== Legend ==
The introduction to the Old French Book of Sydrac is "a largely fictitious tale of a text being passed through history from a legendary King Boctus" down to the school of Toledo. It claims that Theodore of Antioch, Frederick II's court philosopher, obtained the text, which was originally in Arabic, through bribery and passed it on to patriarche Obert de Antioche, who is usually identified with Albert of Rezzato. According to the text, "the Patriarch used it all his life. He had a clerk with him who was called John Pier de Lyons. This man transcribed it and went to the School of Toledo, bringing it with him." Whether there is any truth in this story is unknown.

== Bibliography ==
- Burnett, Charles F. S. (2016). "Master Theodore, Frederick II's Philosopher". Arabic into Latin in the Middle Ages: The Translators and their Intellectual and Social Context. Variorum Collected Studies Series. Routledge. pp. 225–285. [Originally published in Federico II e le Nuove Culture: Atti del XXXI Convegno Storico Internazionale, Todi, 9–12 ottobre, 1994 (Spoleto: 1995).]
- Fappani, Antonio, ed. (2016). "Alberto da Reggio o da Rezzato". Enciclopedia Bresciana. Vol. 1: A. p. 16.
- Gardoni, Giuseppe (2008). Vescovi-podestà nell'Italian Padana (PDF). Libreria Universitaria Editrice.
- Hamilton, Bernard (1980). The Latin Church in the Crusader States: The Secular Church. Variorum.
- Powell, James M. (2010). Anatomy of a Crusade, 1213–1221. University of Pennsylvania Press.
- Runciman, Steven (1954). A History of the Crusades. Vol. 3: The Kingdom of Acre and the Later Crusades. Cambridge University Press.
- Van Cleve, Thomas C. (1972). The Emperor Frederick II of Hohenstaufen: Immutator Mundi. Clarendon Press.
- Williams, Steven J. (2003). The Secret of Secrets: The Scholarly Career of a Pseudo-Aristotelian Text in the Latin Middle Ages. University of Michigan Press.
