= Philip of Tripoli =

Italian Catholic priest

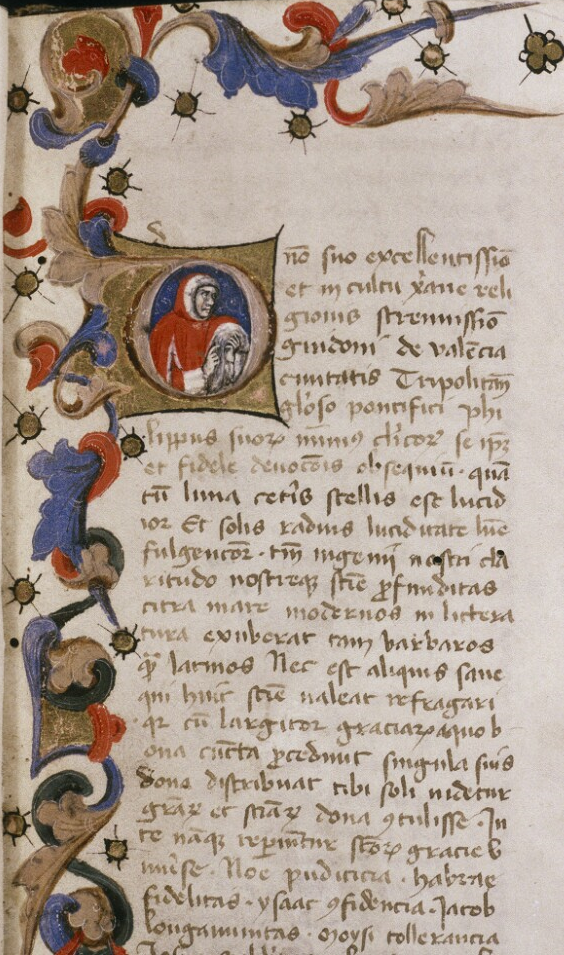
Prologue of Philip's translation from an early 15th-century Italian manuscript. Aristotle depicted.

Philip of Tripoli, sometimes Philippus Tripolitanus or Philip of Foligno (fl. 1218–1269), was an Italian Catholic priest and translator. Although he had a markedly successful clerical career, his most enduring legacy is his translation of the complete Pseudo-Aristotelian Secretum secretorum from Arabic into Latin around 1230.

Little is known of Philip's origins and early life. He seems to have received a good education, specializing in law. His career was divided between various appointments in the Holy Land, where he spent most of the 1220s and late 1250s, and service to the Papacy. He was a canon of Antioch by 1222. In 1225, he briefly held the castle of Cursat. In 1227 he was made a canon of Tripoli and in 1238 of Byblos. In 1238 he served as apostolic legate in Frankish Greece. In 1248 he exchanged his canonry in Byblos for another in Tyre and added an archdeaconry in Sidon to his portfolio.

Philip won a disputed election to the archdiocese of Tyre during the vacancy of 1244–1250, but declined to accept it. He took up a cantorship at Tyre in 1250 instead. In 1251 he was made a papal chaplain, an office he held until his death. In 1266–1267 he was deputy apostolic legate in the Kingdom of Sicily. In 1267 he accepted an archdeaconry at Tripoli. He served the cardinals during the papal election of 1268–1271, being appointed an auditor general in 1269. He died not long after.

== Life ==
=== Education and early postings ===
Philip was probably born between about 1195 and 1200 in Umbria. One document refers to him as a "clerk of Foligno". His uncle Rainier, who was from the county of Todi, served as Latin patriarch of Antioch from 1219 until 1225. Philip received a prebend in Trent in 1218, at which point he would have to have been at least 22 years old unless granted a papal dispensation. A papal subdeacon, Dainisius, was assigned to assist him. He joined his uncle in Antioch sometime between 1219 and 1222, when he received a canonry there. He remained in his uncle's service through 1225. By at the latest 1225, he had become a papal subdeacon. He probably worked for a time in the papal chancery, possibly under his uncle, who had been vice chancellor.

Something of Philip's education can be inferred from papal documents and his translation. In papal documents, he is regularly referred to as a magister (master), a title which indicates that he had received a higher education, probably but not necessarily a university degree. If he did study at university, it was probably the University of Paris or possibly that of Bologna. He evidently had a legal education, and the popes praise his scientia litterarum (knowledge of letters). At least one 13th-century manuscript of the Secretum refers to its translator as magister philosophorum ("a master of philosophers"), and his language regarding Aristotle in the prologue suggests that he had some formal education in philosophy. His Latinity is good which, together with his affected modesty, suggests formal training in rhetoric. Some possible interpolations in the text of the Secretum in defence of astrology have been attributed to Philip, and a correction to its astronomy was almost certainly made by him. Throughout his career, he was a pluralist, which had only been permitted under canon law since the Fourth Lateran Council of 1215, when an exception was carved out for "learned persons".

During his time in the Holy Land Philip seems to have picked up French, the lingua franca of the Crusader states, to judge by some gallicisms in his translation.

=== Antioch to Greece ===
In 1225, Philip was still in his uncle's service at Antioch. When Rainier returned to Italy that year, he gave his nephew charge of the castle and fief of Cursat (Quṣayr), where the patriarchal treasury was located. Philip was tasked with preventing the castle and treasure from falling into the hands of the cash-strapped Prince Bohemond IV of Antioch. Rainier praised Philip to the pope for the assistance he had rendered him during his bouts of illness. He died in September, apparently still in Italy. Pope Honorius III wrote to Philip ordering him to hand the castle over to the proper representatives of the patriarchate during its vacancy.

Philip was still in east in 1227, when Pope Gregory IX granted him a canonry at Tripoli for his services to his late uncle. Philip may have already been an Augustinian, and was almost certainly a priest. He is described as having survived the perils of sea travel and the loss of property in the line of duty while serving Rainier. He may have travelled frequently by ship between Antioch and Tripoli. In 1230, Philip was back in Rome. His uncle's successor, Albert of Rizzato, requested his return to Antioch, but the pope gave him a dispensation to hold his benefices in absentia. He is also described at this time as the prior of Todi. The competition for Philip's services may have owed something to his knowledge of Arabic, a useful diplomatic skill.

Philip may have remained in Italy a long time. In or shortly before 1238, he was granted a canonry in Byblos, but he was in Italy in 1238, when Gregory IX sent him as apostolic legate to Greece. There he collected a tax of one third on income and movable property from the Latin church in order to aid the Latin Empire. Gregory IX also ordered him to investigate the finances of the archdiocese of Patras.

=== Preferment under Innocent IV ===
Philip was back in Rome in 1243, when he denounced the bishop of Byblos as too poorly educated for his office. He had "neither read Donatus nor opened the books of Cato", in Philip's words. That same year, Pope Innocent IV re-appointed him to a canonry in Tripoli, having learned that two had recently become vacant. Philip had evidently never actually received a prebend upon his original appointment, presumably because none were available. The number of canonries attached to the Tripolitan cathedral had been reduced from eighteen to twelve in 1212 owing to the shrunken resources of the diocese. Although Gregory had appointed three men to assure Philip actually received a prebend, it does not appear to have worked. Even when Innocent was careful to wait for confirmation of a vacancy, Philip still had to fight for his canonry between 1243 and 1248. He also fought for at least nine years to receive his canonry in Byblos. The practice of papal provision of canonries could easily lead to situations like Philip's, in which numerous expectative canons were waiting at any time to receive an actual benefice.

Innocent IV showed favour to Philip throughout his pontificate. They may have been personal friends going back to their days in the papal chancery in the early 1220s. On 11 September 1245, Philip was in Genoa as the nuntius (envoy) of Patriarch Robert of Jerusalem and archbishop of Nazareth to take possession of some relics they had purchased. He may have attended the First Council of Lyon in June and July as the patriarch of Jerusalem's representative. In 1247, he was with the pope in Lyon when Innocent IV ordered the patriarch to reward him with a benefice "notwithstanding the fact that he already had others". He was at that time acting as the patriarch's procurator (legal representative) in Europe.

Between 1247 and 1251 Philip seems to have resided mainly in Rome, although he is known to have been away from the papal court on business at one point in 1248. Innocent IV wrote many letters on his behalf during this period of Roman residence. Possibly Philip was teaching law at the Studium Curiae established by Innocent in 1245. In 1248, with papal permission, he resigned his canonry at Byblos to his nephew, the scholar Nicholas. At that time he is first referred to as an honorary chaplain of Cardinal Hugh of Saint-Cher, an honour he held at least as late 1250. In or shortly before 1248, Philip was excommunicated by an unknown process. In 1248, Innocent IV, acting with the advice of Cardinal Pietro da Collemezzo, nevertheless confirmed him in the archdeaconry of Sidon to which he had been appointed and ordered the patriarch of Jerusalem and the bishop of Lydda to undo whatever action had been taken against Philip. Philip was by this time also a canon of Tyre, but the bishop of Tripoli was still opposed to him receiving his prebend at Tripoli.

=== Tyre and Tripoli ===
In 1250, Philip declined his disputed election to the archdiocese of Tyre, handing over the office to the pope. (He may have been elected several years earlier, the previous archbishop having died at the battle of La Forbie in 1244.) Nicholas Larcat succeeded to the vacant see and the pope appointed Philip to Nicholas' former office of cantor of Tyre. This was a non-resident office with substantial revenue, out of which Philip would hire the actual music director. The pope also rewarded him with all of the possessions of the bishop of Bethlehem in Tyre while confirming his prebends in Tyre and Sidon.

By 1251, Philip was an honorary papal chaplain. That year, Innocent IV forbade any sentence (as of excommunication) to be levelled against him without an express papal mandate. He named the patriarch of Jerusalem and the abbot of Belmont as conservators of this order.

In 1256, Pope Alexander IV sent Philip on a mission to the Holy Land: to restore property that rightfully belonged to the archdeacon of Tortosa. He can also be traced in the Holy Land in 1257, when he took out a loan from the Hospitallers on behalf of his superior, Opizo Fieschi, Innocent IV's nephew and the bishop of Tripoli, to finance the latter's voyage overseas. In 1259, he confirmed the Hospitallers' right to the tithe in the lands they possessed within the diocese of Tripoli. This was based on an original agreement of 1125, also made with a cantor of Tripoli named Philip.

=== Last years in Italy ===
By 1267, Philip was archdeacon of Tripoli. (Possibly he was the anonymous archdeacon to whom Pope Urban IV wrote in 1263.) He is referred to in documents with the title dominus (lord), an indication of an elevation in status. He remained an honorary papal chaplain under Pope Clement IV (1265–1268). He served as Cardinal Raoul de Grosparmy's deputy on his legatine mission to the Kingdom of Sicily. He settled an ecclesiastical dispute in Laurino (1266?) and was present when the legate pronounced a sentence at Cosenza (1267).

During the prolonged conclave of 1268–1271, Philip worked for the assembled cardinals. His title changed from capellanus papae (chaplain of the pope) to capellanus sedis apostolicae (chaplain of the apostolic throne) during the long papal vacancy. In April 1269, the cardinals sent him to recoup the castle of Lariano, usurped by a certain Riccardello, and they granted him the power to excommunicate in order to do it. In May, they tasked him with determining the purpose of a group of armed Romans on their way to Viterbo (where the conclave was meeting). In October, he excommunicated Riccardello. He is last mentioned in 1269 with the title of general auditor of causes of the Sacred Palace (auditor generalis causarum sacri palatii), meaning that he could hear cases brought before the papal court and pass judgement subject to papal approval.

Philip died probably not long after 1269. There was a new archdeacon of Tripoli by 1274.

== Translation ==
Around 1230, Philip translated the complete Pseudo-Aristotelian Secretum secretorum from Arabic into Latin. There is evidence for the existence of his translation from the 1230s or 1240s at the latest. In the prologue of his translation, Philip describes how he was on a visit to Antioch with his bishop, Guy of Valence, when a manuscript of the Arabic Secretum was discovered there. At Guy's urging, he translated it into Latin. He dedicated it to the bishop. It is a "remarkably close and accurate" translation. Nonetheless, the only reference in the papal registers to Philip's literary abilities is Innocent IV's praise of him as scientia litterarum.

Describing his method of translation in the prologue, Philip writes, "I have translated ... sometimes literally, and sometimes according to the sense, since there is one way of speaking among the Arabs and another among the Latins". The later Old French translator John of Antioch, also active in the Holy Land, may have been influenced by Philip's prologue.

Over 200 manuscripts of Philip's translation survive from the 13th through 16th centuries. It was the first complete translation from Arabic, although the medical portions had been translated a century earlier by John of Seville, whose translation Philip utilized in his own. Roger Bacon edited and wrote a commentary on Philip's translation between 1243 and 1254, but Michael Scot in his Liber physiognomiae between 1228 and 1236 seems to have used the original Arabic version.

A late medieval copy of the Book on the Inspections of Urine made for the Emperor Frederick II in 1212 attributes it to Philip of Tripoli and Gerard of Cremona. By that time, Philip's reputation was high and was associated with medicine. Some modern scholars have also suggested that he had training in medicine because he owned a copy of John of Seville's translation of the medical chapters and he was credited with helping his uncle during his illness. Another medical treatise, Experimenta notes minime reprobanda, is sometimes ascribed to Philip, but this is a modern misattribution. It is anonymous in all manuscripts but one, which attributes it to Thomas of Cantimpré.

== Bibliography ==
- Hamilton, Bernard (2016) [1980]. The Latin Church in the Crusader States: The Secular Church. Routledge.
- Haskins, Charles H. (1924). Studies in the History of Mediaeval Science. Harvard University Press.
- Haskins, Charles H. (1925). "Arabic Science in Western Europe". Isis. 7 (3): 478–485. doi:10.1086/358333. JSTOR 224296.
- Manzalaoui, Mahmoud A. (1982). "Philip of Tripoli and His Textual Methods". In W. F. Ryan; Charles B. Schmitt (eds.). Pseudo-Aristoteles, the Secret of Secrets: Sources and Influences. The Warburg Institute. pp. 55–72.
- Rubin, Jonathan (2018). Learning in a Crusader City: Intellectual Activity and Intercultural Exchanges in Acre, 1191–1291. Cambridge University Press.
- Williams, Steven J. (2000). "Philip of Tripoli's Translation of the Pseudo-Aristotelian Secretum secretorum Viewed Within the Context of Intellectual Activity in the Crusader Levant". In B. van den Abeele; A. Tihon; I. Draelants (eds.). Occident et Proche-Orient: contacts scientifiques au temps des Croisades. Reminisciences. Vol. 5. Brepols. pp. 79–94. doi:10.1484/m.rem-eb.3.935. ISBN 978-2-503-51116-0.
- Williams, Steven J. (2003). The Secret of Secrets: The Scholarly Career of a Pseudo-Aristotelian Text in the Latin Middle Ages. University of Michigan Press.
