= Kitāb al-Hayawān =

Book by Al-Djahiz

The Kitāb al-Ḥayawān (Arabic: كتاب الحيوان, lit. 'The Book of Animals', Latin: De Animalibus) is an Arabic translation of treatises (Arabic: مقالات, maqālāt) of Aristotle's:

- Historia Animalium: treatises 1–10
- De Partibus Animalium: treatises 11–14
- De Generatione Animalium: treatises 15–19

Medieval Arabic tradition ascribes the translation to Yahya Ibn al-Batriq, but contemporary scholarship does not support this attribution. Several complete manuscript versions exist in Leiden, London, and Tehran, but the text has been edited in separate volumes corresponding to the three Aristotelian sources. The Egyptian existentialist philosopher Abdel Rahman Badawi edited Treatises 1–10 (Historia Animalium) as Ṭibā‘ al-Ḥayawān and Treatises 11–14 (De Partibus Animalium) as Ajzā al-Ḥayawān. Treatises 15–19 (De Generatione Animalium) first appeared in the Aristoteles Semitico-Latinus series in 1971. This series then published Treatises 11–14 in 1979 and Treatises 1–10 in 2018.

== References in philosophy ==
The first known mention of the book appears in a text by the Arab philosopher Al-Kindī (d. 850). Ibn Sīnā (Avicenna) seems to have had direct knowledge of the book, as he paraphrased and commented upon the full text in his encyclopedic Kitāb al-Shifāʾ. In Spain, the 12th-century philosopher Ibn Bājja (Avempace) wrote on De Partibus and De Generatione. It has been remarked that one usually finds references to the Historia in the Eastern Islamicate world, while the other two books are generally referred to in the West, and in conformity to this pattern, Ibn Rushd (Averroes), like Ibn Bājja, wrote commentaries on De Partibus and De Generatione (see below), in which he criticizes Ibn Sīnā's interpretations.

== References in zoography ==
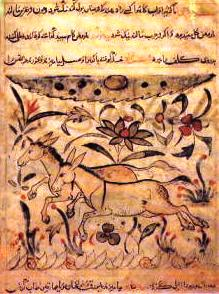
Page from the Kitāb al-Hayawān by Al-Jahiz.

Kitāb al-Hayawān was known at least indirectly to several important zoographers including Al-Jāhiz (Kitāb al-Hayawān), Al-Mas‘ūdī (Murawwaj al-Dhahab), Abū Hayyān al-Tawhīdī (Al-Imtā‘ wa al-Mu’ānasa), Al-Qazwīnī (‘Ajā’ib al-Makhlūqāt), and Al-Damīrī (Hayāt al-Hayawān). They may have known the Aristotelian Kitāb al-Hayawān at second hand from Arabic compendiums of selected passages from the book. The only extant compendium is the Maqāla Tushtamalu ‘àla Fusūl min Kitāb al-Hayawān, attributed (probably falsely) to Mūsà bin Maymūn (Moses Maimonides), and the Greek Compendium of Nicolaus Damascenus was at least partially available by the 11th century.

== In the Christian West ==
The Kitāb al-Hayawān was the source for the Latin translation De Animalibus by Michael Scot in Toledo before 1217. It was alleged by Roger Bacon that Scot "had appropriated to himself the credit of translations which more properly belonged to one Andreas the Jew." This may mean that he had help with the Arabic manuscript, or that he worked fully or in part from a Judaeo-Arabic or Hebrew version. Scot's De Animalibus is available in a partial edition.

The title De Animalibus, first used by Scot, is also used of the 15th-century translations from Greek by George of Trebizond and Theodore Gaza.
