= Adolphe Rome =

Belgian classical philologist and science historian

Adolphe Rome (July 12, 1889, Stavelot – 9 April 1971, Korbeek-Lo) was a Belgian classical philologist and science historian who was particularly concerned with the ancient history of astronomy.

== Education and career ==
Adolphe Rome studied at the Atheneum in Mechelen, where his father Eugène Rome was a teacher of ancient languages. After graduating from the Atheneum, he entered the Catholic seminary in Mechelen and in 1912 was ordained a priest. He then studied classical philology at the University of Louvain and received there, after an interruption of his studies by WWI, his doctorate in 1919. He then worked as a teacher in Schaerbeek and Nivelles and in 1922 received a scholarship at the Institut historique belge de Rome in Rome. From 1924 to 1927 in Paris he studied ancient and medieval calligraphy. From 1927 he taught Greek philology at the University of Louvain, where he was appointed professor in 1929 and taught until 1958. In 1935 he became honorary canon of the cathedral of Mechelen.

During his doctoral studies, Adolphe Rome, who was very interested in mathematics since his school days, settled upon his life-long field of research, the ancient history of science. He received his doctorate with the thesis Les fonctions trigonométriques dans Héron d'Alexandrie. Starting in the 1920s he began writing a critical edition (published from 1931 to 1943) of the commentaries on the Almagest of Ptolemy and the works of Theon of Alexandria, later continued by his student and successor Joseph Mogenet (1913–1980) and his student Anne Tihon (born 1944). Another of Rome's close associates was Albert Lejeune (1916–1988). In addition to his research on the ancient history of science, Rome published essays on many topics of classical philology, such as the works of Pindar, Aeschylus, Euripides and Theocritus.

In 1932 he was one of the co-founders of the magazine L'Antiquité classique. In the 1950s, he became editor-in-chief of the science-historical journal Isis .

Adolphe Rome was elected a corresponding member in 1948 and in 1950 a regular member of the Royal Academies for Science and the Arts of Belgium. In 1950 in Cambridge, Massachusetts, he gave a plenary lecture at the International Congress of Mathematicians (ICM) on The calculation of an eclipse of the sun according to Theon of Alexandria.

== Selected publications ==
See the list of publications in Bibliographie Académique 6, 1914–1934, pp. 132–134; 7, 1934–1954, pp. 233–234; 8, 1954–1955, p. 99; 10, 1957–1963, pp. 369–370.

- Le R. P. Henri Bosmans, S.J. (1852–1928) . In: Isis 12, 1929, No. 1, pp. 88–112.
- Commentaires de Pappus et de Théon d'Alexandrie sur l'Almageste. 3 volumes. Biblioteca Apostolica Vaticana, Rome 1931–1943.
