= Llibre de doctrina del rey Jaume d'Aragó =

The Llibre de doctrina del rey Jaume d'Aragó ("Book of Doctrines of King James I of Aragon") , or simply the Llibre de doctrina ("Book of Doctrines") or the Llibre de saviesa ("Book of Knowledge"), is a moral treatise written in medieval Catalan, belonging to the genre of mirror of princes.

The text is structured in a series of proverbs intended to educate a prince, and is only apocryphally attributed to King James I of Aragon. It has been dated to the 13th century. Like the pseudo-Aristotliean Secretum Secretorum, its content is a combination of political and philosophical elements from Hellenistic and Greco-Roman philosophy interpreted by medieval Scholasticism. It contains letters, aphorisms, predictions, discourses, and other materials.
