= Tihon =

Tihon is a surname. Notable people with the surname include:

- Alizee Tihon (born 1987/1988), competitor in Miss Belgium 2019
- Anne Tihon (born 1944), Belgian historian
- Camille Tihon (1890–1972), Belgian archivist and historian

== See also ==
- Timon
