= Ibn al-Batriq =

Ibn al-Baṭrīq or Ibn Baṭrīq may refer to:

- Yahya Ibn al-Batriq (fl. 796–806), Syriac Orthodox Greek–Arabic translator
- Eutychius of Alexandria, born Sa'id ibn Batriq, Chalcedonian patriarch (r. 933–940), wrote a history in Arabic
