= William Ogle =

William Ogle may refer to:

- William Ogle, 1st Viscount Ogle (died 1670), English soldier and politician, MP for Winchester
- William Ogle (Northumberland MP) (1653–1718), English army officer and politician
- Sir William Ogle (1823–1885), fifth of the Ogle baronets
- William Ogle (physician) (1827–1912), English physician, classicist and statistician
- William Wallis Ogle (active 19th century), member of the Ogle family

== See also ==
- William Ogle Carr (1802–1856), ninth Chief Justice of Ceylon and eighth King's Advocate of Ceylon
- John William Ogle (1824–1905), English physician
