= Hiltgart von Hürnheim =

German Cistercian nun and translator

- Born: c. 1250
- Died: after 7 April 1299
- Occupations: Cistercian nun, translator
- Known for: Translating Secretum Secretorum into Middle High German

Hiltgart von Hürnheim (c. 1250 – after 7 April 1299) was a German Cistercian nun, who has been identified as the translator of the 1282 Middle High German version of the Secretum Secretorum, a pseudo-Aristotelian work purported to be written by Aristotle to Alexander the Great on various topics.

== The Secretum Secretorum ==
The Secretum Secretorum is a pseudo-Aristotelian treatise which was one of the most successful works of the late Middle Ages. It presents itself as a collection of letters by Aristotle to Alexander the Great, but is now thought to have been originally written in Arabic during the tenth century. The Secretum Secretorum was translated into Latin by Philippus Tripolitanus around 1230, which was then itself translated into a number of European vernaculars.

== Hiltgart's Ain taugenhait der taugen ==
Among these vernacular translations is a Middle High German version, titled Ain taugenhait der taugen and dated to 1282. The translation begins with a prologue in which the author artfully conceals their identity while leaving the reader enough clues to infer the same. They refer to themselves as a young nun of Klosterzimmern, who had been commissioned to translate the Secretum Secretorum by a monk named Rudolf von Hürnheim and granted permission to that end by the abbess Elsbeth. These hints enabled George Kriesten to identify the author of this translation as Hiltgart von Hürnheim, who entered the Cistercian convent at Klosterzimmern in 1262 and is last testified there in a document of 7 April 1299.

In her prologue, Hiltgart disparaged her abilities as a translator. The modern editor of her translation however found it to be a faithful and high-quality translation, which contains few factual errors. Other commentators have also noted that Hiltgart refrained from editorialising non-Christian material in the text. As such, Hiltgart was likely to have been playing to contemporary expectations of female authors, particularly given her youth and the difficult, even potentially heretical, content of the text that she had translated. Robert Luff has argued that Hiltgart's prologue is also proof of her abilities as an author, as in it she manages to successfully conceal and reveal her identity.

After its completion, copies of Hiltgart's translation were sent to other Cistercian houses, including Seligenthal convent. Luff suggests that the translation may also have been intended for lay readers at court. However, only two copies are believed to have survived to the present day. One (now CGM 288 at the Bavarian State Library) is thought to have been copied at Seligenthal the mid fifteenth century, and the other was bought by a private American buyer in 1931. A further copy was destroyed during World War II. As such, the work survives mostly in print, with three editions of Hiltgart's translation being printed at Augsburg in 1531 and 1532. Hiltgart's translation may have inspired later German authors, such as Goethe in his West-östlicher Divan (1819; 1827) and Wilhelm Hertz's Die Sage vom Giftmädchen (1893).

== Sources ==
- Green, Monica H. (2000). "Books as a Source of Medical Education for Women in the Middle Ages" (PDF). Dynamis.
- Hürnheim, Hiltgart von (1963). Mittelhochdeutsche Prosaübersetzung des "Secretrum secretorum". Edited by Reinhold Möller. Akademie-Verlag.
- Luff, Robert (1999). "Hiltgart von Hürnheim als Übersetzerin". In Luff, Wissensvermittlung im europäischen Mittelalter: >Imago mundi<-Werke und ihre Prologe. Max Niemeyer Verlag.
- Thornton, Thomas Perry (January 1965). "Hiltgart von Hürnheim. Mittelhochdeutsche Übersetzung des "Secretum Secretorum." by Hiltgart von Hürnheim, Reinhold Möller". The Journal of English and Germanic Philology. 64 (1).
