= Rainier of Antioch =

Rainier (Note: Italian: Ranieri; Latin: Ranerius, Raynerius) (died 16 September 1225) was an Italian cleric who served as the vice-chancellor of the Roman church from 1216 until 1219 and the Latin patriarch of Antioch from 1219 until his death.

Nothing much of Rainier's early life is known. He is described as coming from the castle called Castrum Vetus (Old Castle) in the county of Todi in the papal document confirming him as patriarch. He probably received a formal education, most likely in law. He is described by Pope Honorius III as a "man of knowledge" (virum scientia) and a document of 1215 may indicate that he had a university degree.

Before becoming vice-chancellor, Rainier was the prior of the basilica of San Frediano in Lucca, a community of canons regular. He may have been a canon regular himself, but more likely the posting was a sinecure. He probably served in the Roman chancery for some time before his appointment as vice-chancellor. Possibly he met the future Honorius III when the latter was vice-chancellor in 1194–1197, since he became vice-chancellor in 1216 shortly after Honorius III's election as pope. A document of 1215 refers to an apostolic notary called Master Rainier, which may be the future patriarch.

Rainier was consecrated patriarch of Antioch in November 1219. He replaced Peter of Capua, Honorius' previous nominee, who was being promoted to a cardinalate. The pope informed the Antiochene chapter of the change in a letter of December. At Antioch, Rainier quarrelled with Prince Bohemond IV, who was confiscating church properties to make up shortfalls of cash. Himself short of money, Rainier attempted to reignite Antioch's claim to the archdiocese of Tyre, which responded by claiming jurisdiction over the church in the County of Tripoli, which was under Antiochene control. Honorius quashed both claim and counterclaim as unprofitable when most of the territory in question was not even in Christian hands.

Rainier's pontificate saw the reopening of the schism between Latins and Orthodox in the church of Antioch. This was the result of a broken marriage alliance between Antioch and the kingdom of Cilician Armenia. Bohemond IV's son Philip had been married to Queen Isabella, but in 1224 he was imprisoned by Constantine of Baberon and the following year he died. Latin churchmen were expelled from Cilician Armenia, and the Orthodox refused to recognize the Latin patriarch.

At some point Rainier was joined in Antioch by his nephew, Philip, who had probably served under him in the chancery. He experienced bouts of illness in Antioch, and in a letter credits Philip for taking care of him. In 1225, he returned to Italy, leaving Philip in control of the castle of Cursat, where the patriarchal treasury was kept. He died while in Italy, for his death on 16 September is mentioned by Honorius in a letter dated 25 September and news could not have travelled so fast from Antioch to Rome.

== Bibliography ==
- Hamilton, Bernard (2016) [1980]. The Latin Church in the Crusader States: The Secular Church. Routledge. ISBN 9780860780724.
- Williams, Steven J. (2003). The Secret of Secrets: The Scholarly Career of a Pseudo-Aristotelian Text in the Latin Middle Ages. University of Michigan Press.
