= Liber introductorius =

13th century book trilogy

Liber introductorius (Classical Latin: [ˈliːbɛr ɪntroːdʊkˈtoːrɪ.ʊs], Ecclesiastical Latin: [ˈliber introdukˈtori.us]; The Introductory Book) (Note: Some sources refer to the first book in the trilogy as the Liber introductorius, whereas other sources specify that the first book is the Liber quatuor distinctionum and that Liber introductorius is the name of the trilogy as a whole.) is the collective name for a trilogy of books written by Scottish mathematician Michael Scot in the early 13th century. The trilogy concerns the art of divination. Because the work's prologue mentions the canonization of St. Francis of Assisi, it is likely that the assemblage was officially compiled after July 16, 1228 (i.e. the date of the aforementioned canonization).

== Contents ==
The Liber introductorius is the collective title for the divination-centered trilogy written by Michael Scot, which takes the form of an encyclopedia dedicated to Holy Roman Emperor Frederick II. The work is made up of four parts: a prologue, and three volumes. The first volume in the trilogy is the Liber quatuor distinctionum (The Book of the Four Distinctions). The second is the Liber particularis (The Singular Book). The third and final volume is the Liber physiognomiae, which concerns physiognomy.

== Bibliography ==
- Edwards, Glenn M. (1985). "The Two Redactions of Michael Scot's 'Liber Introductorius'". Traditio. 41: 329–340. doi:10.1017/S0362152900006942. JSTOR 27831175. S2CID 151735943.
- Meyer, Christian (2010). "Music and Astronomy in Michael Scot's Liber Quatuor Distinctionum". Archives d'histoire doctrinale et littéraire du Moyen Âge. 76 (1): 119–177. doi:10.3917/ahdlm.076.0119. (subscription required)
- Pick, Lucy (1998). "Michael Scot in Toledo: Natura Naturans and the Hierarchy of Being". Traditio. 53: 93–116. doi:10.1017/S0362152900012095. JSTOR 27831961. S2CID 141258756. (subscription required)
- Resnick, Irven M. (2012). Marks of Distinctions: Christian Perceptions of Jews in the High Middle Ages. CUA Press. ISBN 978-0-8132-1969-1.
