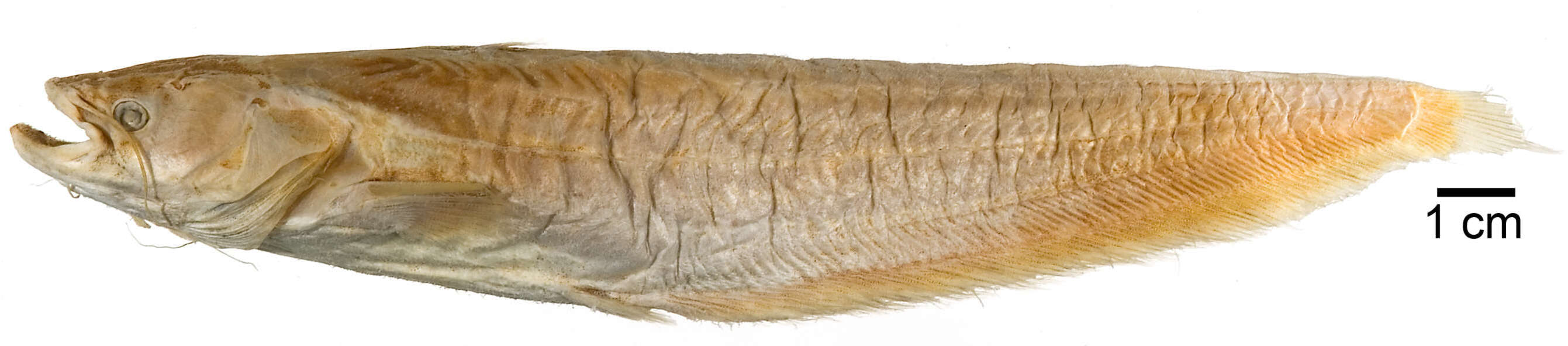

Conservation status
- Endangered (IUCN 3.1)

Scientific classification
- Kingdom: Animalia
- Phylum: Chordata
- Class: Actinopterygii
- Order: Siluriformes
- Family: Siluridae
- Genus: Silurus
- Species: S. aristotelis

Binomial name
- Silurus aristotelis Garman, 1890

Synonyms
- Siluris aristotelis (Agassiz, 1857) [orth. error]

= Aristotle's catfish =

Species of fish

Aristotle's catfish (Silurus aristotelis) is a species of fish in the family Siluridae. It is endemic to Greece, where it occurs in the Acheloos River drainage. Its natural habitat is freshwater lakes. It is threatened by habitat loss. This species grows to a length of 46 centimetres (18 in) TL and is of importance to local commercial fisheries. It is known from Lake Trichonida, Lake Lysimachia and Lake Amvrakia, and was introduced to Lake Volvi and Lake Ioannina in the 1980s. Threats may be water pollution and overfishing.

Its name derives from the fact that it was first described by Aristotle in his History of Animals.
