= Koz Castle =

Castle in Turkey

- Altınözü, Hatay Province
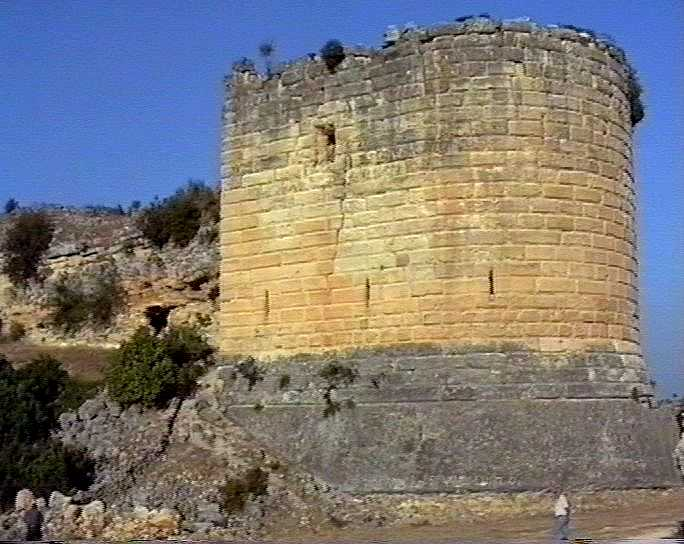
- Koz Castle

Site information
- Type: Fortress
- Open to the public: Yes

Location
- Location within Turkey
- Coordinates: 36°6′N 36°12′E

Site history
- Built by: Principality of Antioch
- Materials: Ashlar
- Demolished: Partly

Koz Castle (Turkish: Koz Kalesi), or Kürşat Castle is a castle in the Altınözü district of the Hatay Province of Turkey, built on a small hill where the Kuseyr Creek starts. It was built by the Principality of Antioch out of ashlar. The castle used to have a gate to the north, but this gate no longer exists and the eastern side of the castle has been leveled, with some original barns left. Some bastions of the castle have remained standing.

== History ==
The formerly known Cursat Castle was first mentioned of in 1133, when taken by King Fulk of Jerusalem. By 1155, the castle came into the possession of the Latin patriarch of Antioch, Aimery of Limoges, who used the castle as a sanctuary for himself and his treasures, to be known as 'Castrum Patriarchae' (Patriarch's Castle). In 1180, Aimery excommunicated Prince Bohemond III of Antioch, following the orders of Pope Alexander III, for matters in his private life. Bohemond III who was angered by that decision, besieged Cursat until King Baldwin IV of Jerusalem intervened.

In 1188, Aimery prevented the troops of the Ayyubid sultan Saladin from attacking Cursat by paying him a sum of money from his treasury. In 1225, the Latin patriarch of Antioch, Rainier of Antioch, returned to Italy, leaving Philip of Tripoli in control of the castle of Cursat, where the patriarchal treasury was kept.

Later on, Pope Innocent IV had ordered that the entire church tax revenue from Antioch and Cyprus should be used for the repair and expansion of Cursat for three years, which enhanced its defenses by 1256. Hence, the castle withstood a siege by Mamluk forces led by Baibars in 1268.

After the fall of Antioch, Cursat was surrounded by Muslim-controlled territory. The castellan of the castle in the name of the patriarch was a knight named Sir William, who endeavored to maintain friendly contact with the neighboring Muslim emirs, especially with the emirs of Soghr and Bagras. Baibars refrained from attacking the castle on the condition that William shared his income with his Muslim neighbors. Later on, William became a monk and left the management of the castle to his father Bastard. On April 13, 1275, the latter was caught in a Mamluk ambush, then imprisoned in Damascus. The castle was later besieged, and finally surrendered on November 14, 1275.

== See also ==
- List of Crusader castles

== Bibliography ==
- Folda, Jaroslav (2005). Crusader art in the Holy Land: from the Third Crusade to the fall of Acre, 1187–1291. Cambridge University Press.
- Hamilton, Bernard (2000). The Leper King and His Heirs. Baldwin IV and the Crusader Kingdom of Jerusalem. Cambridge University Press.
- Marshall, Christopher (1994). Warfare in the Latin East, 1192-1291. Cambridge University Press.
- Williams, Steven J. (2003). The Secret of Secrets: The Scholarly Career of a Pseudo-Aristotelian Text in the Latin Middle Ages. University of Michigan Press.
