= Guy of Valence =

Guy (or Guido) of Valence was a bishop of Tripoli whose episcopate probably fell in the period 1228–1237. He is an obscure figure, whose name is known only from the prologue of Philip of Tripoli's Latin translation of the Pseudo-Aristotelian Secretum secretorum, in which he dedicates the work "to his most excellent lord Guido, (Note: A list of numerous manuscript variants of the naming and titling of Guy is found in Williams 2003, pp. 96–97.) originally (Note: The word here translated "originally" is Latin vere. The historian Robert Steele, in his edition of Roger Bacon's copy of the Secreturm secretorum, took this for the surname de Vere and posited that Guy was the son of Guy II de Vere, who is known to have made a donation to the Knights Hospitaller of Jerusalem. According to Barrow 1987, p. 189, this last was a great-grandson of Aubrey de Vere I and the father of Gilbert de Vere, grand prior of the Hospitallers in England in 1195–1198. Guy II died around 1205. Williams 2003, pp. 92–95, discusses and dismisses Steele's hypothesis.) of Valence, glorious pontiff of the city of Tripoli, (Note: The reading of metropolis (metropolitan bishop) for Tripolis is rejected in Williams 2003, pp. 98–99. Roger Bacon, whose copy reads metropolis, added the note Napolis, suggesting that Guy was an archbishop of Naples. Steele accepted Bacon's reading (since there are a few gaps in the bishops' list for Naples), but suggested that he may instead have been an archbishop of Tyre. According to Barrow 1987, p. 189, there is a gap in the Tyrean bishops' list for 1244–1251.) most strenuous in the cultivation of the Christian religion."

Guy was from Valence. He may have been related to the John of Valence, canon of Tripoli, who was elected prior of the cathedral in 1244. In his prologue, Philip praises Guy's learning: "the clarity of your genius and the depth of your knowledge in letters exceeds that of all contemporaries on this side of the sea [i.e., Outremer], whether Latins or natives. . . [Y]ou are most learned in the liberal arts, the most expert in things legal and ecclesiastical, the most learned in things moral and divine." This flattery strongly suggests that Guy was a highly educated man, and the most probable place of his study was the studium specializing in Roman law within the Abbey of Saint-Ruf in Valence.

Guy may have come east on the Fifth Crusade with his brother Berlon. Other identifications have been proposed. He may be the Master Guy who was archdeacon of Caesarea in 1207, or the Master Guy who was a notary and acting vice-chancellor in the papal chancery in 1222–1226. If this is so, he may have first met Philip of Tripoli, himself a former chancery official, in Rome. Possibly he came to the Holy Land with Gerold of Lausanne, the bishop of Valence who was appointed patriarch of Jerusalem in 1225.

Philip's translation was made no later than the 1240s, which provides a terminus ante quem for Guy's pontificate. There are many gaps in the reconstructed list of bishops of Tripoli in the first half of the 13th century. Guy's pontificate most likely falls after that of Bishop Robert, attested in March–July 1228, since Philip only became a canon of Tripoli in 1227. The next named bishop is Albert, installed in 1243 after a period of vacancy. Thus, Guy probably became bishop in late 1228 or 1229, and his death may have occurred as early as 1232 or perhaps in late 1236 or early 1237. In May 1237, Pope Gregory IX refers to a deceased bishop of Tripoli with the initial G., which may have been the recently deceased Guy of Valence.

According to Philip of Tripoli's account, he and Guy discovered an Arabic manuscript of the Secretum on a visit to Antioch and Guy urged him to translate it. This probably took place in or about 1230. It is unclear who initiated the search for the manuscript or if that was their purpose in Antioch.
