= William Ogle (physician) =

English physician & classicist (1827-1912)

William Ogle BA DM FRCP (21 December 1827 - 12 April 1912) was an English physician and classicist who became registrar-general of the General Register Office.

After attending Rugby School Ogle took a BA in Natural Sciences at Corpus Christi College, Oxford. He lectured in physiology at St George's Hospital after which he was appointed to various other posts before retiring from there and working at the General Register Office, where he was eventually appointed registrar-general.

After retirement he made use of his classical Greek in the translation of various works of Aristotle, notably The Parts of Animals a copy of which he presented to Charles Darwin.

== Bibliography ==
Works by William Ogle:

- 1882 Aristotle on the Parts of Animals Translated, with introduction and notes, by W. Ogle. London: Kegan Paul & Co.
- 1897 Aristotle On Youth & Old Age, Life & Death and Respiration Translated, with introduction and notes by W. Ogle. London: Longmans & Co.
