= History of Animals =

Work by Aristotle

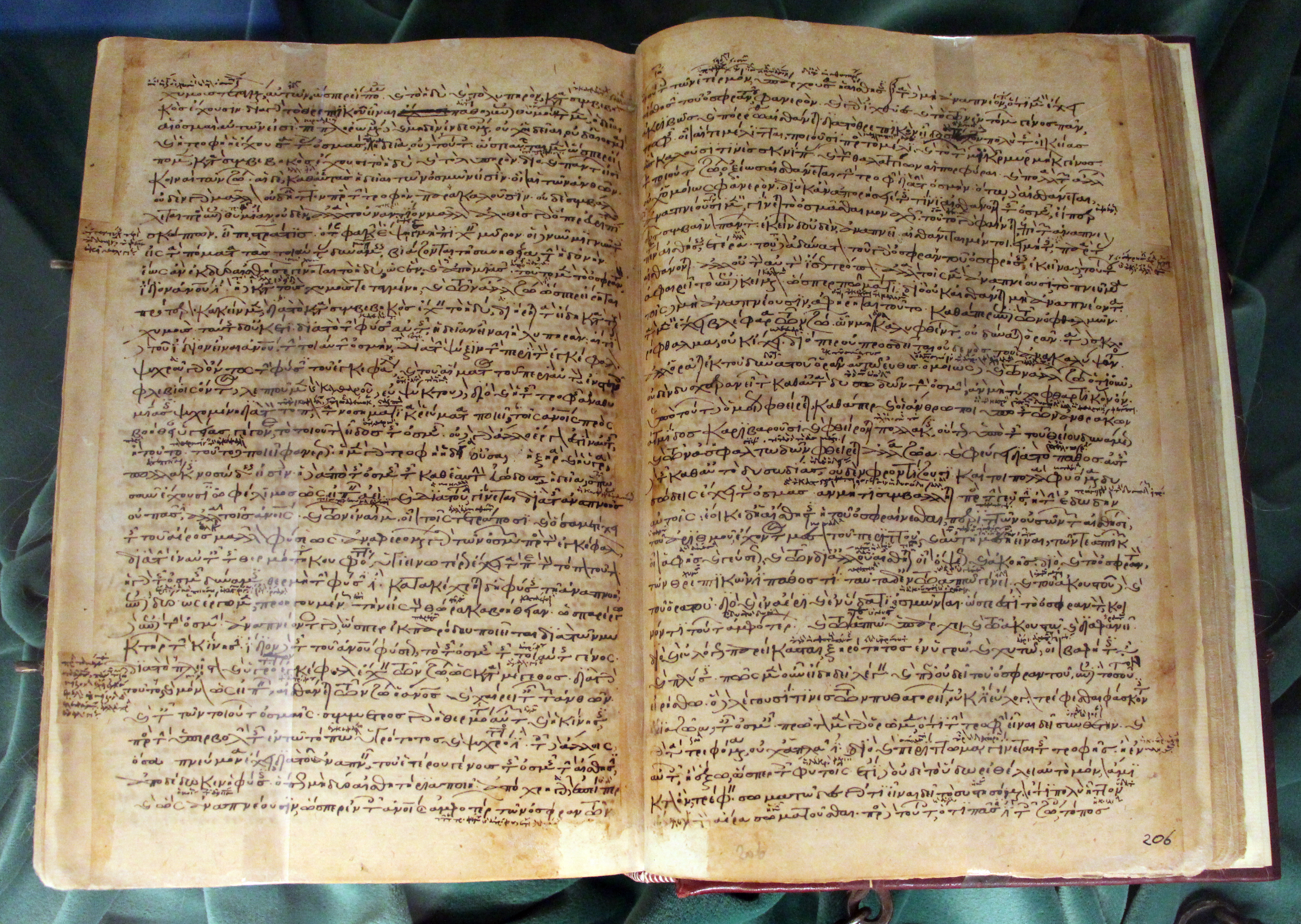
Historia animalium et al., Constantinople, 12th century (Biblioteca Medicea Laurenziana, pluteo 87.4)

History of Animals (Ancient Greek: Τῶν περὶ τὰ ζῷα ἱστοριῶν, Ton peri ta zoia historion, "Inquiries on Animals"; Latin: Historia Animalium, "History of Animals") is one of the major texts on biology by the ancient Greek philosopher Aristotle. It was written in sometime between the mid-fourth century BC and Aristotle's death in 322 BC.

Generally seen as a pioneering work of zoology, Aristotle frames his text by explaining that he is investigating the what (the existing facts about animals) prior to establishing the why (the causes of these characteristics). The book is thus an attempt to apply philosophy to part of the natural world. Throughout the work, Aristotle seeks to identify differences, both between individuals and between groups. A group is established when it is seen that all members have the same set of distinguishing features; for example, that all birds have feathers, wings, and beaks. This relationship between the birds and their features is recognized as a universal.

The History of Animals contains many accurate eye-witness observations, in particular of the marine biology around the island of Lesbos, such as that the octopus had colour-changing abilities and a sperm-transferring tentacle, that the young of a dogfish grow inside their mother's body, or that the male of a river catfish guards the eggs after the female has left. Some of these were long considered fanciful before being rediscovered in the nineteenth century. Aristotle has been accused of making errors, but some are due to misinterpretation of his text, and others may have been based on genuine observation. He did however make somewhat uncritical use of evidence from other people, such as travellers and beekeepers.

The History of Animals had a powerful influence on zoology for some two thousand years. It continued to be a primary source of knowledge until zoologists in the sixteenth century, such as Conrad Gessner, all influenced by Aristotle, wrote their own studies of the subject.

== Context ==
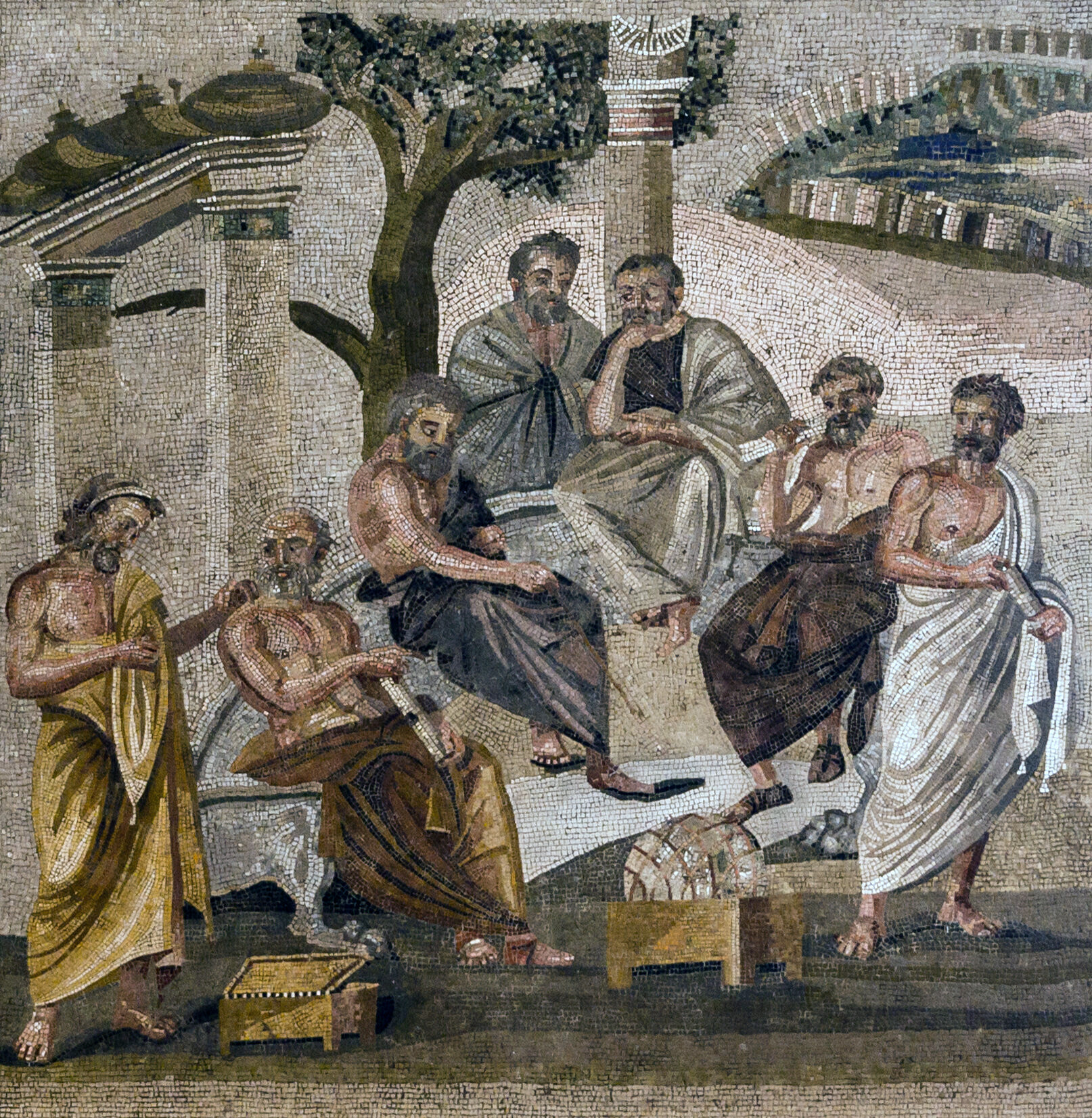
Aristotle spent many years at Plato's academy in Athens (Mosaic, 1st century, Pompeii).

Aristotle (384–322 BC) studied at Plato's Academy in Athens, remaining there for some 17 years. Like Plato, he sought universals in his philosophy, but unlike Plato he backed up his views with detailed observation, notably of the natural history of the island of Lesbos and the marine life in the island's lagoon at Pyrrha. This study made him the earliest natural historian whose written work survives. No similarly detailed work on zoology was attempted until the sixteenth century; accordingly Aristotle remained highly influential for some two thousand years. His writings on zoology form about a quarter of his surviving work. Aristotle's pupil Theophrastus later wrote a similar book on botany, Enquiry into Plants.

== Book ==
=== Approach ===
In the History of Animals, Aristotle sets out to investigate the existing facts (Greek "hoti", what), prior to establishing their causes (Greek "dioti", why). The book is thus a defence of his method of investigating zoology. Aristotle investigates four types of differences between animals: differences in particular body parts (Books I to IV); differences in ways of life and types of activity (Books V, VI, VII and IX); and differences in specific characters (Book VIII).

To illustrate the philosophical method, consider one grouping of many kinds of animal, 'birds': all members of this group possess the same distinguishing features—feathers, wings, beaks, and two bony legs. This is an instance of a universal: if something is a bird, it has feathers and wings; if something has feathers and wings, that also implies it is a bird, so the reasoning here is bidirectional. On the other hand, some animals that have red blood have lungs; other red-blooded animals (such as fish) have gills. This implies, in Aristotle's reasoning, that if something has lungs, it has red blood; but Aristotle is careful not to imply that all red-blooded animals have lungs, so the reasoning here is not bidirectional.

While there is consensus that the History of Animals was aimed mostly at describing attributes of animals, there is a debate about whether or not it suggests that Aristotle was also interested in producing a taxonomy. Most philosophers who have studied the History of Animals and Aristotle's other writings suggest that Aristotle was not trying to produce a taxonomy, but more recent studies by biologists reach different conclusions.

=== Contents ===
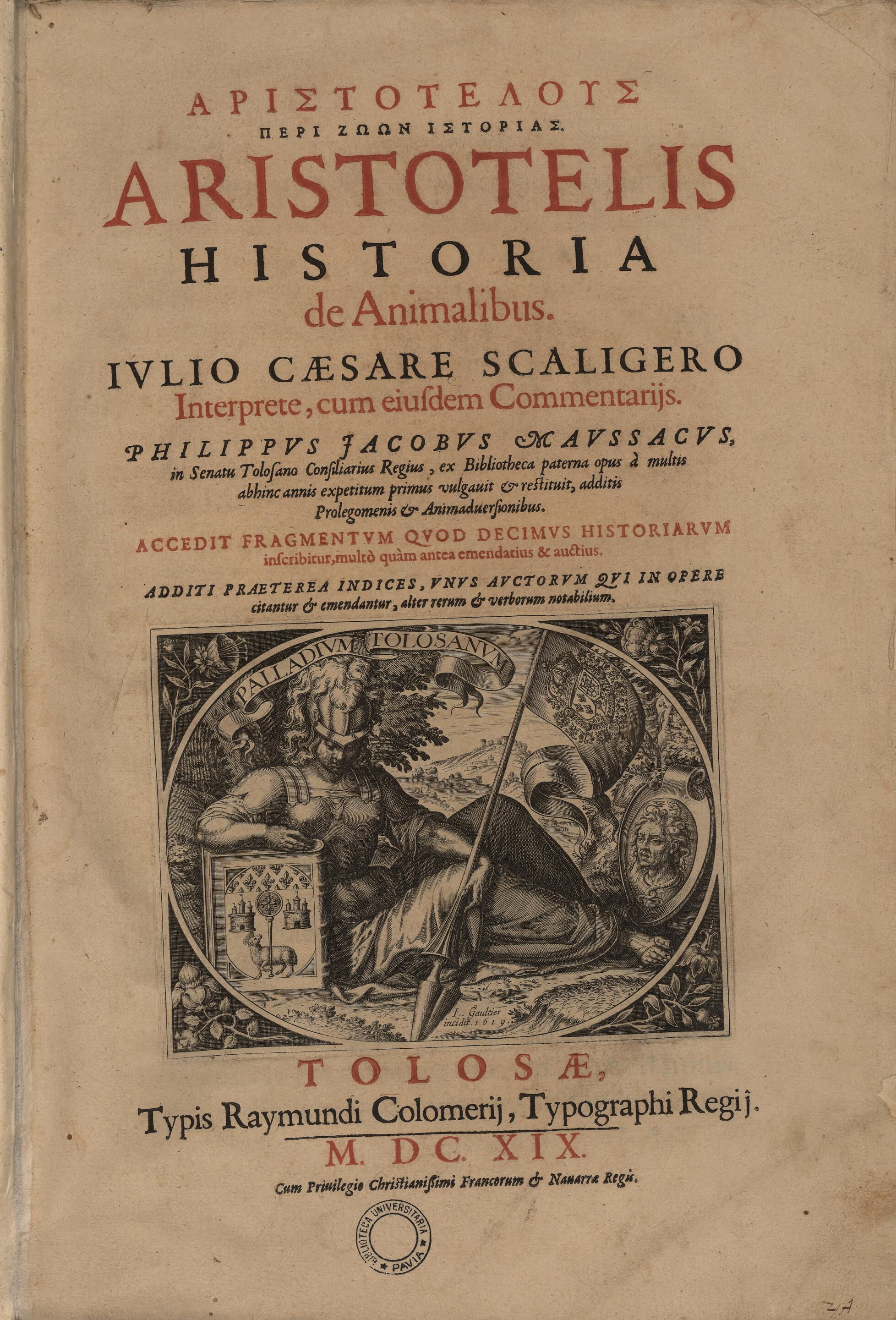
Scaliger's edition with his commentary, Toulouse, 1619

Book I The grouping of animals and the parts of the human body. Aristotle describes the parts that the human body is made of, such as the skull, brain, face, eyes, ears, nose, tongue, thorax, belly, heart, viscera, genitalia, and limbs.

Book II The different parts of red-blooded animals. Aristotle writes about limbs, the teeth of dogs, horses, man, and elephant; the elephant's tongue; and of animals such as the apes, crocodile, chameleon, birds especially the wryneck, fishes and snakes.

Book III The internal organs, including generative system, veins, sinews, bone etc. He moves on to the blood, bone marrow, milk including rennet and cheese, and semen.

Book IV Animals without blood (invertebrates) – cephalopods, crustaceans, etc. In chapter 8, he describes the sense organs of animals. Chapter 10 considers sleep and whether it occurs in fish.

Books V and VI Reproduction, spontaneous and sexual of marine invertebrates, birds, quadrupeds, snakes, fish, and terrestrial arthropods including ichneumon wasps, bees, ants, scorpions, spiders, and grasshoppers.

Book VII Reproduction of man, including puberty, conception, pregnancy, lactation, the embryo, labour, milk, and diseases of infants.

Book VIII The character and habits of animals, food, migration, health, animal diseases including bee parasites, and the influence of climate.

Book IX Social behaviour in animals; signs of intelligence in animals such as sheep and birds.

A tenth book is included in some versions, dealing with the causes of barrenness in women, but is generally regarded as not being by Aristotle. In the preface to his translation, D'Arcy Wentworth Thompson calls it "spurious beyond question".

=== Observations ===
The History of Animals contains a large number of eye-witness observations, in particular of marine biology, in sharp contrast to Plato's "symbolic zoology". Aristotle's style and precision can be seen in the passage where he discusses the behaviour and anatomy of the cephalopods, mentioning the use of ink against predators, camouflage, and signalling. This is D'Arcy Thompson's translation:

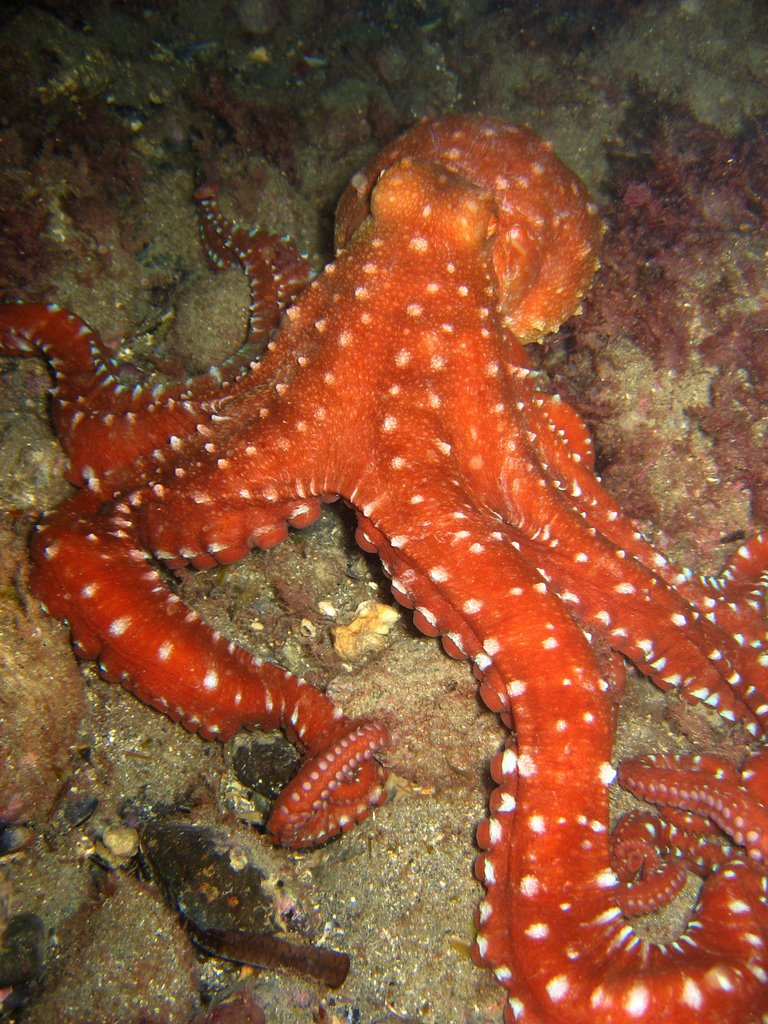
Aristotle observed that the octopus can change colour when disturbed.

Of molluscs the sepia is the most cunning, and is the only species that employs its dark liquid for the sake of concealment as well as from fear: the octopus and calamary make the discharge solely from fear. These creatures never discharge the pigment in its entirety; and after a discharge the pigment accumulates again. The sepia, as has been said, often uses its colouring pigment for concealment; it shows itself in front of the pigment and then retreats back into it; it also hunts with its long tentacles not only little fishes, but oftentimes even mullets. The octopus is a stupid creature, for it will approach a man's hand if it be lowered in the water; but it is neat and thrifty in its habits: that is, it lays up stores in its nest, and, after eating up all that is eatable, it ejects the shells and sheaths of crabs and shell-fish, and the skeletons of little fishes. It seeks its prey by so changing its colour as to render it like the colour of the stones adjacent to it; it does so also when alarmed.

— Historia Animalium IX.621b–622a

His observations were almost all accurate, according to the philosopher Anthony Preus, though Mario Vegetti argues that Aristotle sometimes let theory cloud observation.

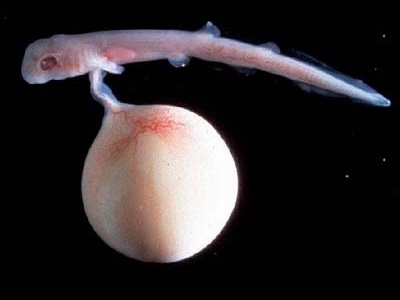
Aristotle recorded that the embryo of a dogfish was attached by a cord to a kind of placenta (the yolk sac).

Some of Aristotle's observations were not taken seriously by science until they were independently rediscovered in the 19th century. For example, he recorded that male octopuses have a hectocotylus, a tentacle which stores sperm and which can transfer it into the female's body; sometimes it snaps off during mating. The account was dismissed as fanciful until the French naturalist Georges Cuvier described it in his 1817 Le Règne Animal. Aristotle also noted that the young of the dogfish grow inside their mother's body attached by a cord to something like a placenta (a yolk sac). This was confirmed in 1842 by the German zoologist Johannes Peter Müller. Aristotle noted, too, that a river catfish which he called the glanis cares for its young, as the female leaves after giving birth; the male guards the eggs for forty or fifty days, chasing off small fish which threaten the eggs, and making a murmuring noise. The Swiss American zoologist Louis Agassiz found the account to be correct in 1890.

Aristotle's methods of observation included dissection (Aristotle's lost companion work, The Dissections, contained illustrations of these), so he observed animal anatomy directly, though his interpretations of the functions of the structures he observed were subject to error. Like other classical authors such as Pliny the Elder, Aristotle also gathered evidence from travellers and people with specialised knowledge, such as fishermen and beekeepers, without much attempt to corroborate what they said.

=== Apparent errors ===
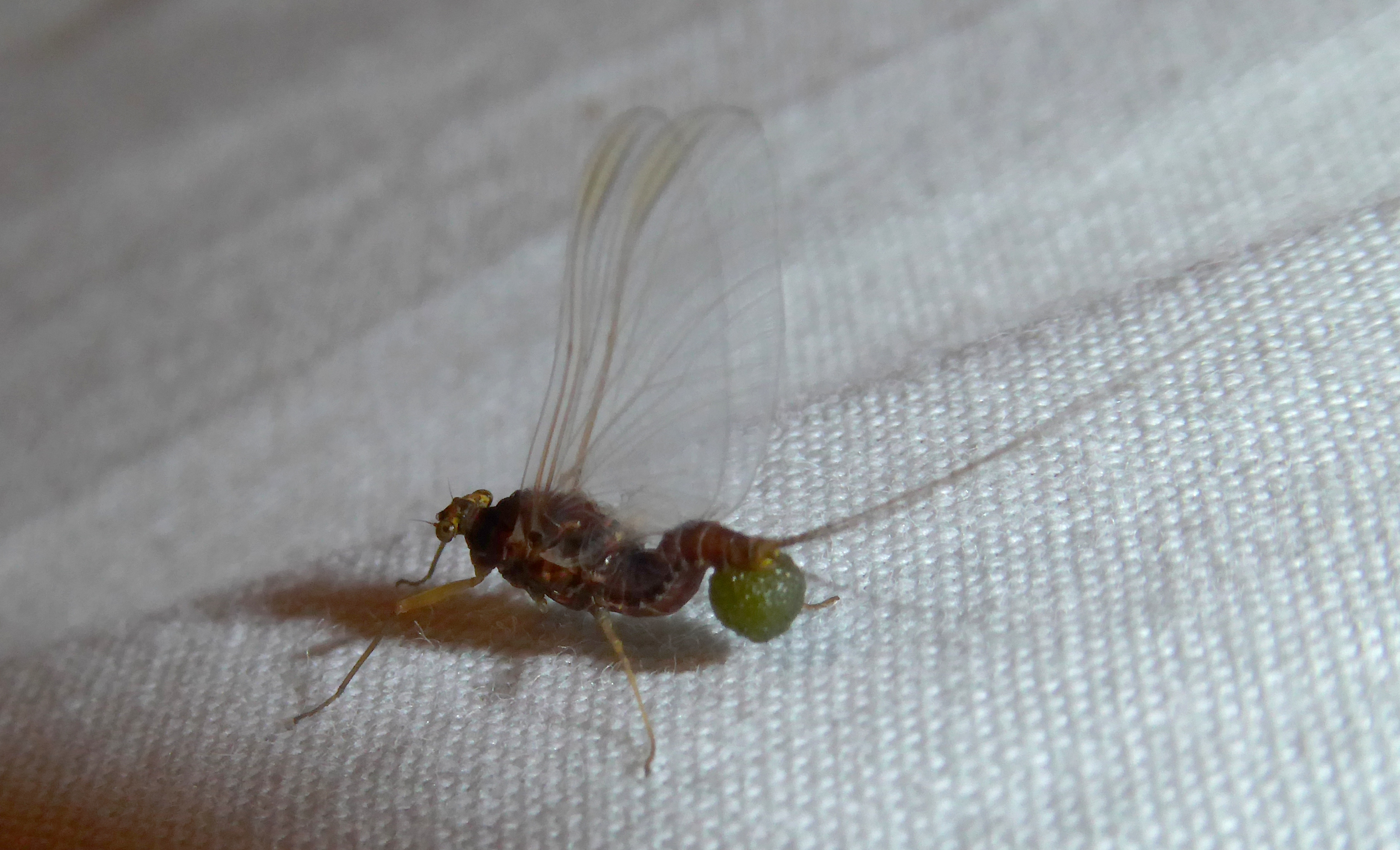
Mayflies walk on four legs, as Aristotle stated.

The text contains some claims that appear to be errors. Aristotle asserted in book II that female humans, sheep, goats, and swine have a smaller number of teeth than the males. This apparently false claim could have been a genuine observation, if as Robert Mayhew suggests women at that time had a poorer diet than men; some studies have found that wisdom teeth erupt in men more often than women after age 25. But the claim is not true of other species either. Thus, Philippa Lang argues, Aristotle may have been empirical, but he was quite laissez-faire about observation, "because [he] was not expecting nature to be misleading".

In other cases, errors may have been wrongly attributed to Aristotle. Katrin Weigmann wrote "[Aristotle's] statement that flies have four legs was repeated in natural history texts for more than a thousand years despite the fact that a little counting would have proven otherwise." However, the historian and philosopher of biology John S. Wilkins notes that Aristotle did not say "all flies have four legs"; he wrote that one particular animal, the ephemeron or mayfly, "moves with four feet and four wings: and, I may observe in passing, this creature is exceptional not only in regard to the duration of its existence, whence it receives its name, but also because though a quadruped it has wings also." Mayflies do in fact walk on four legs, the front pair not being adapted for walking, so, Wilkins concludes, Aristotle was correct.

More generally, Aristotle's biology, described across the five books sometimes called On Animals and some of his minor works, the Parva Naturalia, defines what in modern terms is a set of models of metabolism, temperature regulation, information processing, inheritance, and embryogenesis. All of these are wrong in the sense that modern science has replaced them with different models, but they were scientific in that they attempted to explain observed phenomena, proposed mechanisms, and made testable predictions.

=== Translations ===
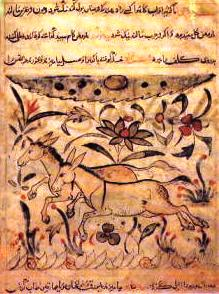
Page from the medieval Arabic translation, Kitāb al-Hayawān by Al-Jahiz

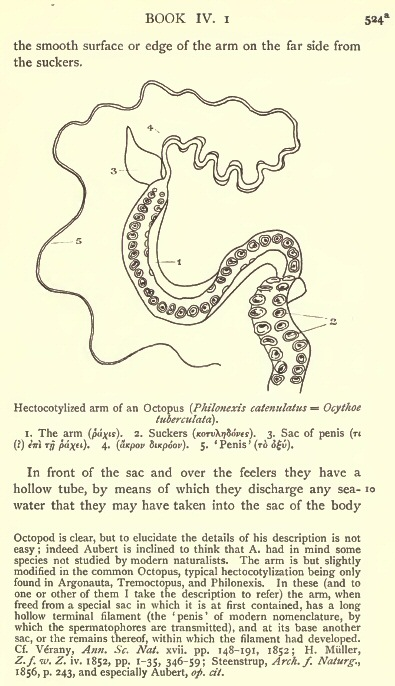
D'Arcy Thompson's illustration of the octopus's hectocotyl arm in a page of his 1910 translation (Note: D'Arcy Thompson translated the relevant passage of Book IV.1 as follows: "In all cases their feet are furnished with suckers. The octopus, by the way, uses his feelers either as feet or hands; with the two which stand over his mouth he draws in food, and the last of his feelers he employs in the act of copulation; and this last one, by the way, is extremely sharp, is exceptional as being of a whitish colour, and at its extremity is bifurcate; that is to say, it has an additional something on the rachis, and by rachis is meant the smooth surface or edge of the arm on the far side from the suckers.")

The Arabic translation comprises treatises 1–10 of the Kitāb al-Hayawān (The Book of Animals). It was known to the Arab philosopher Al-Kindī (d. 850) and commented on by Avicenna among others. It was in turn translated into Latin, along with Ibn Rushd (Averroes)'s commentary on it, by Michael Scot in the early 13th century.

English translations were made by Richard Cresswell in 1862 and by the zoologist D'Arcy Wentworth Thompson in 1910.

A French translation was made by Jules Barthélemy-Saint-Hilaire in 1883. Another translation into French was made by J. Tricot in 1957, following D'Arcy Thompson's interpretation.

A German translation of books I–VIII was made by Anton Karsch, starting in 1866. A translation of all ten books into German was made by Paul Gohlke in 1949.

== Influence ==
The comparative anatomist Richard Owen said in 1837 that "Zoological Science sprang from [Aristotle's] labours, we may almost say, like Minerva from the Head of Jove, in a state of noble and splendid maturity".

Ben Waggoner of the University of California Museum of Paleontology wrote that

Though Aristotle's work in zoology was not without errors, it was the grandest biological synthesis of the time, and remained the ultimate authority for many centuries after his death. His observations on the anatomy of octopus, cuttlefish, crustaceans, and many other marine invertebrates are remarkably accurate, and could only have been made from first-hand experience with dissection. Aristotle described the embryological development of a chick; he distinguished whales and dolphins from fish; he described the chambered stomachs of ruminants and the social organization of bees; he noticed that some sharks give birth to live young—his books on animals are filled with such observations, some of which were not confirmed until many centuries later.

Walter Pagel comments that Aristotle "perceptibly influenced" the founders of modern zoology, the Swiss Conrad Gessner with his 1551–1558 Historiae animalium, the Italian Ulisse Aldrovandi (1522–1605), the French Guillaume Rondelet (1507–1566), and the Dutch Volcher Coiter (1534–1576), while his methods of looking at time series and making use of comparative anatomy assisted the Englishman William Harvey in his 1651 work on embryology.

Armand Marie Leroi's 2014 book The Lagoon: How Aristotle Invented Science and BBC documentary Aristotle's Lagoon set Aristotle's biological writings including the History of Animals in context, and propose an interpretation of his biological theories.

== Editions ==
- Dean-Jones, Lesley (2023). Historia animalium book X: Aristotle's endoxon, topos and dialectic 'On Failure to Reproduce'. Cambridge, United Kingdom: Cambridge University Press. ISBN 978-1107015159.
