= Secretum Secretorum =

Pseudo-Aristotelian treatise

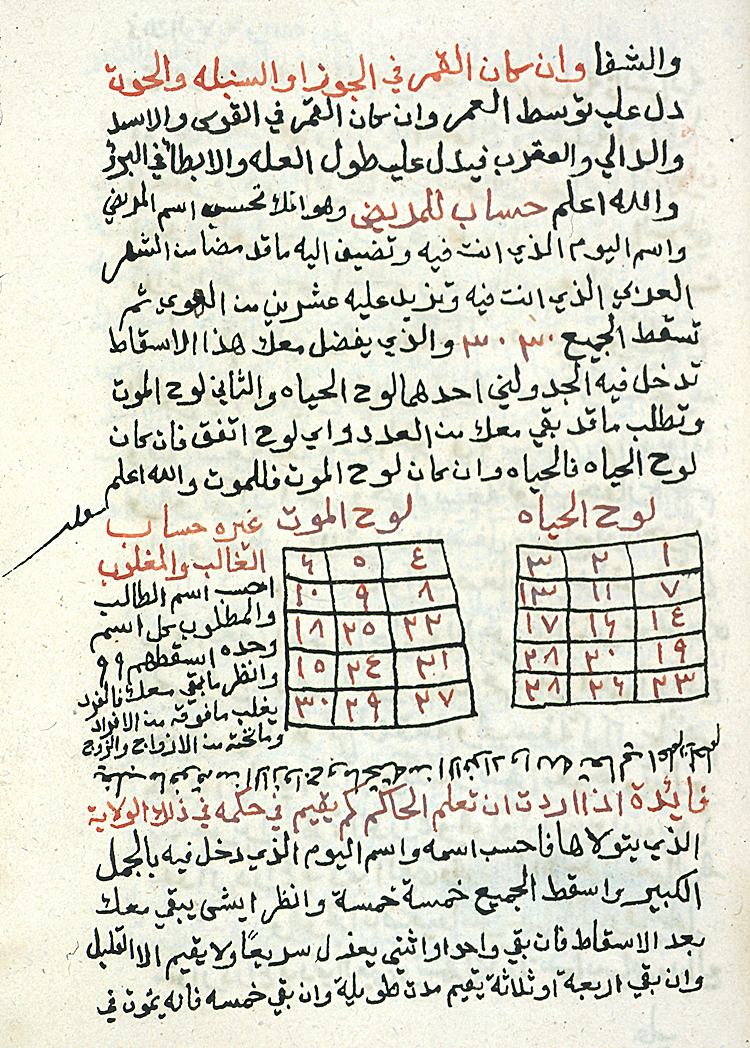
Two charts from an Arabic copy of the Secretum Secretorum for determining whether a person will live or die based on the numerical value of the patient's name.

The Secretum Secretorum or Secreta Secretorum (Latin, 'Secret of secrets'), also known as the Sirr al-Asrar (Arabic: كتاب سر الأسرار, lit. 'The Secret Book of Secrets'), is a treatise which purports to be a letter from Aristotle to his student Alexander the Great on an encyclopedic range of topics, including statecraft, ethics, physiognomy, astrology, alchemy, magic, and medicine. The earliest extant editions claim to be based on a 9th-century Arabic translation of a Syriac translation of the lost Greek original. It is a pseudo-Aristotelian work. Modern scholarship finds it likely to have been written in the 10th century in Arabic. Translated into Latin in the mid-12th century, it was influential among European intellectuals during the High Middle Ages.

== Origin ==
The origin of the treatise remains uncertain. The Arabic edition claims to be a translation from Greek by 9th-century scholar Abu Yahya ibn al-Batriq (died 806 CE), and one of the main translators of Greek-language philosophical works for al-Ma'mun, working from a Syriac edition which was itself translated from a Greek original. It contains supposed letters from Aristotle to his pupil Alexander the Great. No such texts have been discovered and it appears the work was actually composed in Arabic. The letters may thus derive from the Islamic and Persian legends surrounding Alexander. The Arabic treatise is preserved in two versions: a longer 10-book version and a shorter version of 7 or 8 books; the latter is preserved in about 50 copies.

Modern scholarship considers that the text must date to after the Encyclopedia of the Brethren of Purity and before the work of Ibn Juljul in the late 10th century. The section on physiognomy may have been circulating as early as AD 940. (Note: British Library manuscript supposedly copied by Muhammad ibn Ali ibn Durustawayh in Isfahan in AD 941 contains a physiognomy similar to the Secretum Secretorum's but is probably a 20th-century forgery.) The Arabic version was translated into Persian (at least twice), Ottoman Turkish (twice), Hebrew, Spanish, and twice into Latin. (The Hebrew edition was also the basis for a translation into Russian.) The first Latin translation of a part of the work was made for the Portuguese queen c. 1120 by the converso John of Seville; it is now preserved in about 150 copies under the title Epistola Aristotelis ad Alexandrum de regimine sanitatis ("Aristotle's letter to Alexander on good health"). The second translation, this time of the whole work, was done at Antioch c. 1232 by the canon Philip of Tripoli for Bishop Guy of Tripoli; it is preserved in more than 350 copies. Some 13th-century editions include additional sections.

== Contents ==
The Secretum Secretorum claims to be a treatise written by Aristotle to Alexander during his conquest of Achaemenid Persia. Its topics range from ethical questions that face a ruler to astrology to the medical and magical properties of plants, gems, and numbers to an account of a unified science that is accessible only to a scholar with the proper moral and intellectual background. Copland's English translation is divided into sections on the work's introduction, the Manner of Kings, Health, the Four Seasons of the Year, Natural Heat, Food, Justice, Physiognomy, and Comportment.

The enlarged 13th-century edition includes alchemical references and an early version of the Emerald Tablet.

== Legacy ==
It was one of the most widely read texts of the High Middle Ages or even the most-read. Amid the 12th-century Renaissance's Recovery of Aristotle, medieval readers took the ascription to Aristotle at face value and treated this work among Aristotle's genuine works. It is particularly connected with the 13th-century English scholar Roger Bacon, who cited it more often than his contemporaries and even produced an edited manuscript with his own introduction and notes, an unusual honor. This led mid-20th century scholars like Steele to claim that Bacon's contact with the Secretum Secretorum was the key event pushing him towards experimental science; more recent scholarship is less sweeping in its claims but still accords it an important place in the research of his later works.

The Latin Secretum Secretorum was eventually translated into Czech, Russian, Croatian, Dutch, German, Icelandic, English, Aragonese, Catalan, Spanish, Portuguese, French, Italian, and Welsh. The 1528 English translation by Robert Copland was based on Philip of Tripoli's Latin edition.

Scholarly attention to the Secretum Secretorum waned around 1550 but lay interest has continued to this day among students of the occult. Scholars today see it as a window onto medieval intellectual life: it was used in a variety of scholarly contexts and had some part to play in the scholarly controversies of the day.
