= Yahya ibn al-Batriq =

Yaḥyā (or Yuḥannā) ibn al-Biṭrīq (working 796 – 806) was a Christian scholar who pioneered the translation of ancient Greek texts into Arabic, a major early figure in the Graeco-Arabic translation movement under the Abbasid empire. He translated for Al-Ma'mun the major medical works of Galen and Hippocrates, and also translated Ptolemy Tetrabiblos.

Translation was not a completely developed skill: al-Batriq worked by a combination of direct word-for-word translation and transliteration of ancient Greek words into Arabic where no equivalent was to be found.

He compiled the encyclopedic Sirr al-Asrar, or the Book of the Science of Government: On the Good Ordering of Statecraft, which became known to the Latin-speaking medieval world as Secretum Secretorum ("[The Book of] the Secret of Secrets") in a mid-12th century translation; it treated a wide range of topics, including statecraft, ethics, physiognomy, astrology, alchemy, magic and medicine. The origins of the treatise are uncertain. No Greek original exists, though al-Batriq claims in the Arabic treatise that it was translated from the Greek into Syriac and from Syriac into Arabic.
