= Michael Scot =

Scottish mathematician and scholar (1175–c.1232)

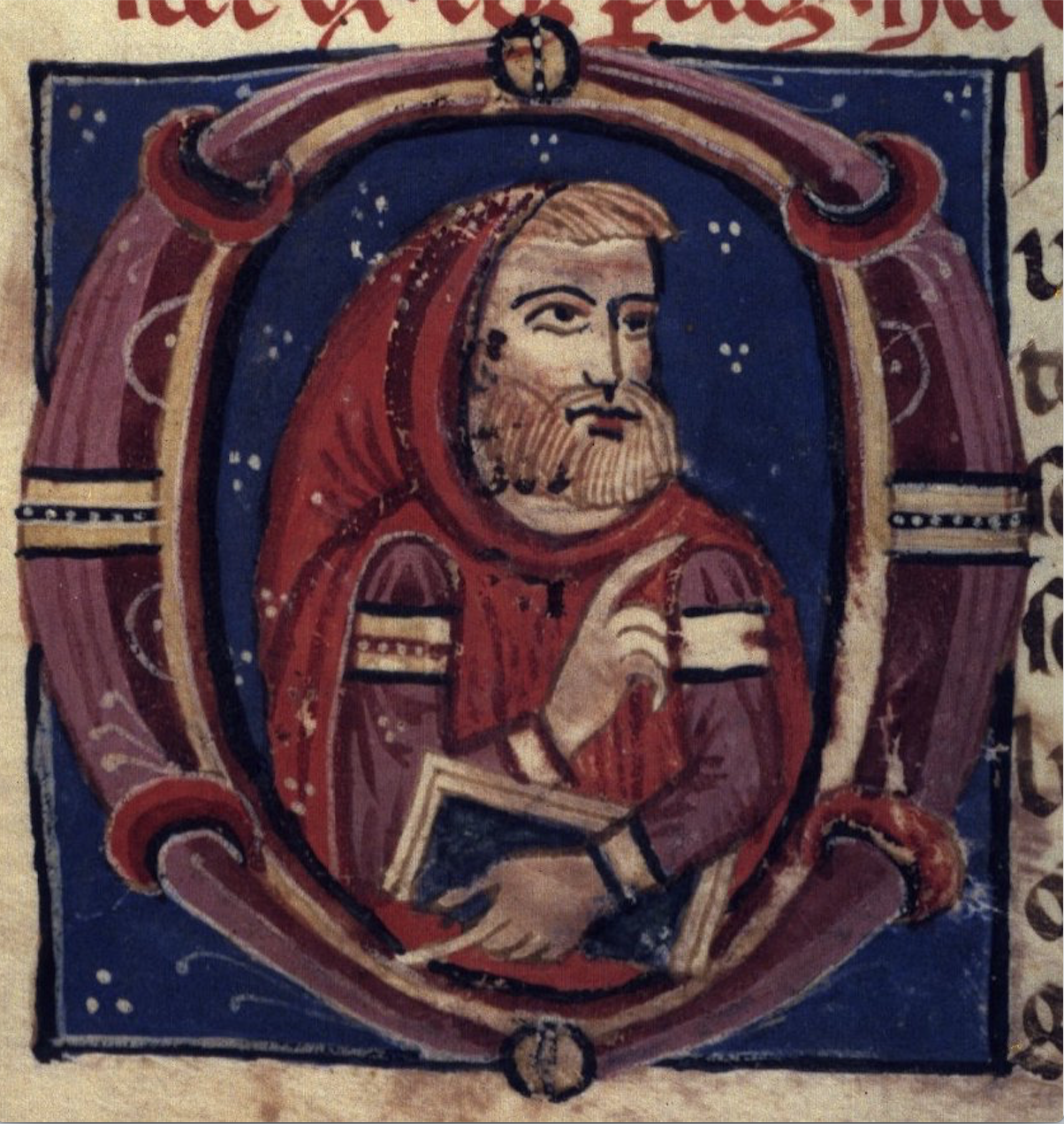
- Michael Scot in the Bodleian Library's; Liber physiognomiae manuscript
- Born: Michael Scot; 1175
- Died: c. 1232
- Scientific career
- Fields: Mathematics, astrology, alchemy

Michael Scot (Latin: Michael Scotus; 1175 – c. 1232) was a Scottish mathematician and scholar in the Middle Ages. He was educated at Durham, Oxford and Paris, and worked in Bologna and Toledo, where he learned Arabic. His patron was Frederick II of the Holy Roman Empire and Scot served as science adviser and court astrologer to him in Palermo, then capital of the Kingdom of Sicily. Scot translated Averroes and was the greatest public intellectual of his day.

== Early life and education ==
Scot was born somewhere in the border regions of Scotland. He studied first at the cathedral school of Durham and then at Oxford and Paris, devoting himself to philosophy, mathematics, and astrology. It appears that he had also studied theology and become an ordained priest, as Pope Honorius III wrote to Stephen Langton on 16 January 1223/4, urging him to confer an English benefice on Scot, and nominated Scot as archbishop of Cashel in Ireland. Scot declined this appointment, but he seems to have held benefices in Italy.

From Paris, Scot went to Bologna, and then after a stay at Palermo, to Toledo. There he learnt Arabic well enough to study the Arabic versions of Aristotle and the many commentaries in Arabic upon these. In addition, he studied the original works of Avicenna and Averroes, and translated them into Latin.

== Career ==
Scot was a typical example of the polyglot wandering scholar of the Middle Ages—a churchman who knew Latin, Greek, Arabic and Hebrew. When he was about 50, Frederick II attracted him to his court in the Kingdom of Sicily. At the instigation of the emperor, Scot supervised (along with Hermannus Alemannus) a fresh translation of Aristotle and the Arabian commentaries from Arabic into Latin. Translations by Scot survive of the Historia animalium, De anima, and De caelo, along with the commentaries of Averroes upon them.

The second version of Fibonacci's famous book on mathematics, Liber Abaci, was dedicated to Scot in 1227. It has been suggested that Scot played a part in Fibonacci's presentation of the Fibonacci sequence. A recent study of a passage written by Michael Scot on multiple rainbows, a phenomenon understood only by modern physics and recent observations, suggests that Michael Scot may have had contact with the Tuareg people in the Sahara desert.

In a letter of 1227, recorded by Scot in his Liber particularis, Emperor Frederick questioned him concerning the foundations of the earth, the geography and rulership of the heavens, what is beyond the last heaven, in which heaven God sits, and the precise locations of hell, purgatory and heavenly paradise. He also asked about the soul; and about volcanoes, rivers, and seas. According to the chronicler Fra Salimbene, Frederick attempted to catch Scot out in his calculations of the distance to heaven by scaling from the height of a church tower (by having it secretly lowered). Scot replied by saying that either the moon had gotten further away or the tower had gotten shorter. (Note: See Masson (1957) for the text of the questions.)

Scot was a pioneer in the study of physiognomy. His manuscripts dealt with astrology, alchemy and the occult sciences generally, and account for his popular reputation. Note that a recent article posits that Michael Scot with his skills in Alchemy had a significant behind-the-scenes role in the creation of the Augustalis gold coin introduced by Frederick II. The 1979 Physics Nobel laureate Abdus Salam claimed in his acceptance speech that while visiting the medical school at Salerno, "chartered by Frederick in 1231", Michael Scot met the Danish physician Henrik Harpestræng, later to become Court Physician of King Erik Plovpenning.

These works include:

- Super auctorem spherae, printed at Bologna in 1495 and at Venice in 1631.
- De sole et luna, printed at Strassburg (1622), in the Theatrum chimicum, and containing more alchemy than astronomy, the sun and moon appearing as the images of gold and silver.
- De chiromantia, an opuscule concerning chiromancy
- A divination-centered trilogy of books collectively titled the Liber introductorius ("The Introductory Book") which includes: the Liber quatuor distinctionum, the Liber particularis, and the Liber physiognomiae (Note: Some sources refer to the first book in the trilogy as the Liber introductorius, whereas other sources specify that the first book is the Liber quatuor distinctionum and that Liber introductorius is the name of the trilogy as a whole.)

The Liber physiognomiae (which also exists in an Italian translation) and the Super auctorem spherae expressly state that the author undertook the works at the request of the Emperor Frederick II.

"Every astrologer is worthy of praise and honour," Scot wrote, "since by such a doctrine as astrology he probably knows many secrets of God, and things which few know."

He was offered in 1223 the role of being the Archbishop of Cashel in Ireland by Pope Honorius III; then that of Canterbury in 1227 by Pope Gregory IX.

Some sources report that Emperor Frederick used scholars like Michael Scot as messengers to Arab rulers like Al-Kamil for diplomatic and scholarly exchanges because of his knowledge of Arabic, and, that he even brought Michael Scot to the Holy Land during the Sixth Crusade in 1228-29.

== Death ==
The date of Scot's death remains uncertain. The efforts of Walter Scott and others to identify him with the Sir Michael Scot of Balwearie, sent in 1290 on a special embassy to Norway, have not convinced historians; though the two may have had family connections.

A legend popular in the late 13th and early 14th centuries said that Scot foresaw that a small stone would strike him in the head and kill him, so he wore an iron skullcap to avoid his death. However, he removed the cap in church, only to be struck by a stone and die.

== In legend ==
The legendary Michael Scot used to feast his friends with dishes brought by spirits from the royal kitchens of France and Spain and other lands.

He is said to have turned a coven of witches to stone, which have become the stone circle of Long Meg and Her Daughters in Cumbria.

Scot's reputation as a magician had already become fixed in the age immediately following his own. He appears in Dante's Divine Comedy, the only Scot to do so, in the fourth bolgia located in the Eighth Circle of Hell, reserved for sorcerers, astrologers, and false prophets who claimed they could see the future when they, in fact, could not. He is described by Dante as being "spare in the flank" (ne' fianchi è cosi poco). While some argue that this is the "sole extant description of his physical appearance", others contend that the description is more poetic. Richard Kay argues that because "the shades in the Dantesque afterworld create surrogate aerial bodies for themselves that are a projection of [their] soul[s]", this description is in reference to "some internal character trait to which [Dante] wished to draw our attention." Kay argues that Dante was referencing a physiognomic description taken from Scot's own Liber physiognomiae – namely, that thin and small ribs signify an individual "who is weak, who does little labour, who is sagacious, [and] bad" (the original Latin, found in chapter 88 of the Liber physiognomiae, reads: Cuius costae sunt subtiles et paruae […] significat hominem debilem, pauci laboris, sagacem [et] malum).

Scot also had a particular reputation for his ability to predict the future. Fra Salimbene makes a comparison between Asdente of Parma, a cobbler who predicted the death of Nicholas III and election of Martin IV, and the "Abbot Joachim, Merlin, Methodius, the Sibyls, Isaiah, Jeremiah, Hosea, Daniel, the Apocalypse, and Michael the Scot."

Giovanni Boccaccio represents him in the same character, and Giovanni Pico della Mirandola arraigns him severely in his work against astrology, while Gabriel Naudé finds it necessary to defend his good name in his Apologie pour tous les grands personages faussement soupçonnez de magie.

In John Leyden's ballad Lord Soulis, Michael Scot is credited with teaching magic to the protagonist, the evil sorcerer William II de Soules, who ends up being boiled alive.

Sir Walter Scott deploys Michael Scott (sic) in his The Lay of the Last Minstrel. In Footnotes 12/13, he credits him with conquering an indefatigable demon, after it had succeeded in splitting Eildon Hill into its three distinctive cones, by challenging it to weave ropes from sea-salt. He records that in the Scottish Borders any work of great labour or antiquity is ascribed either to Auld Michael, or Sir William Wallace, or the Devil.

He is the title character in the play The Warld's Wonder by Alexander Reid and one of the main characters in the fantasy novel The Lord of Middle Air by Michael Scott Rohan.

== Sources ==
- Ackermann, Silke (2009), Sternstunden am Kaiserhof: Michael Scotus und sein Buch von den Bildern und Zeichen des Himmels ISBN 978-3-631-59489-6.
- Burnett, Charles S.F. (1994). "Michael Scot and the Transmission of Scientific Culture from Toledo to Bologna via the Court of Frederick II Hohenstaufen". Micrologus. 2: 101–126.
- Edwards, Glenn M. (1985). "The Two Redactions of Michael Scot's 'Liber Introductorius'". Traditio. 41: 329–340. doi:10.1017/S0362152900006942. JSTOR 27831175. S2CID 151735943.
- (in English) Herbermann, Charles, ed. (1913). "Michael Scotus" . Catholic Encyclopedia. New York: Robert Appleton Company.
- Kay, Richard (1985). "The Spare Ribs of Dante's Michael Scot". Dante Studies, with the Annual Report of the Dante Society (103). The Johns Hopkins University Press: 1–14. JSTOR 40166404. (subscription required)
- Masson, Georgina (1957), Frederick II of Hohenstaufen - a Life. London, Secker & Warburg.
- Meyer, Christian (2010). "Music and Astronomy in Michael Scot's Liber Quatuor Distinctionum". Archives d'histoire doctrinale et littéraire du Moyen Âge. 76 (1): 119–177. doi:10.3917/ahdlm.076.0119. (subscription required)
- Pick, Lucy (1998). "Michael Scot in Toledo: Natura Naturans and the Hierarchy of Being". Traditio. 53: 93–116. doi:10.1017/S0362152900012095. JSTOR 27831961. S2CID 141258756. (subscription required)
- Resnick, Irven M. (2012). Marks of Distinctions: Christian Perceptions of Jews in the High Middle Ages. CUA Press. ISBN 9780813219691.
- Scott, Tony; Harper, David (2023). "Michael Scot and the Music of the Spheres". Transversal: International Journal for the Historiography of Science (15): 1–11. doi:10.24117/2526-2270.2023.i15.08.
- Wood, Brown, J. (1897), Life and Legend of Michael Scot.
- Thorndike, Lynn (1965), Michael Scot ISBN 1-4254-5505-0, ISBN 978-1-4254-5505-7.
