= Anne Tihon =

Anne Tihon (born 1944) is a Belgian historian of science specializing in the history of astronomy, with works on Theon of Alexandria, Byzantine astronomy, and astronomical tables. She is a professor emerita in the Faculty of Philosophy, Arts and Letters of the Université catholique de Louvain.

== Books ==
Tihon's books and critical editions include:

- Barlaam de Seminara, Traités sur les éclipses de soleil de 1333 et 1337 [ Barlaam of Seminara's treatises on the solar eclipses of 1333 and 1337], with Joseph Mogenet and Daniel Donnet, Éditions Peeters, 1977
- Le petit commentaire de Théon d'Alexandrie aux tables faciles de Ptolémée [The Little Commentary of Theon of Alexandria on Ptolemy's Handy Tables], Studi e Testi Roma, 1978
- Le "Grand Commentaire" de Theon d'Alexandrie aux tables faciles de Ptolemee, Vatican Library, Vol. I (with Joseph Mogenet), 1985; Vols. II–III, 1991; Vol. IV, 1999
- Études d'astronomie byzantine [Studies in Byzantine astronomy], Ashgate, 1994
- Georges Gémiste Pléthon, Manuel d'astronomie [Gemistus Pletho, Manual of astronomy], with Raymond Mercier, Academia Bruylant, 1998
- Une version Byzantine du traité sur l'astrolabe du Pseudo-Messahalla [A Byzantine version of the Pseudo-Messahalla astrolabe treatise], with Régine Leurquin and Claudy Scheuren, Bruylant, 2001
- Πτολεμαιου προχειροι κανονες: Les Tables Faciles de Ptolémée [Ptolomy's Handy Tables], Vols. Ia–Ib, with Raymond Mercier, Université catholique de Louvain, 2011
- Conformément aux observations d'Hipparque : le Papyrus Fouad inv. 267A [In accordance with Hipparchus's observations: the Papyrus Fouad inv. 267A], with Jean-Luc Fournet and Raymond Mercier, Université catholique de Louvain, 2014

== Recognition ==
Tihon became a corresponding member of the International Academy of the History of Science in 1986, and was raised to a full member in 2002.
