= Mongol incursions in the Holy Roman Empire =

Part of the first great Mongol invasion of Europe

"A Tartar Feast", miniature illustration by Matthew Paris depicting Mongol cannibalism at the siege of Neustat

Mongol incursions in the Holy Roman Empire took place in the spring of 1241 and again in the winter of 1241–1242. They were part of the first Mongol invasion of Europe.

The Mongols did not advance far into the Holy Roman Empire and there was no major clash of arms on its territory. Rather, the army that had invaded Poland, after harassing the eastern borders of the Kingdom of Germany, crossed the March of Moravia in April–May 1241 to rejoin the army that had invaded Hungary. The Mongol army was composed mainly of Cuman and Russian auxiliaries, whose homelands had been conquered by the Mongols. During their transit, they laid waste the Moravian countryside but avoided strongholds. King Wenceslaus I of Bohemia was joined by some German princes, but he monitored the Mongols in Moravia without seeking battle. There were more significant skirmishes in the north of the Duchy of Austria a month later that left several hundred dead, but there was no cooperation between the Austrians and Hungarians.

In response to the Mongol threat, the imperial church and the imperial princes held assemblies to organize a military response. Pope Gregory IX ordered the preaching of a crusade and from Italy Emperor Frederick II issued an encyclical to that end. A crusading army under the command of King Conrad IV of Germany mustered on 1 July 1241, but was disbanded a few weeks after setting out because the danger had passed.

Although there was no major military action in the Empire, rumours that the Mongols had been checked there spread far beyond the Empire's borders. There are records in several languages from Spain to Armenia of the Bohemian or German king defeating the Mongols and forcing their retreat. In Moravia, a supposed victory over the Mongols took on legendary proportions. In Germany, some contemporary writers attributed the Mongols' general retreat from Europe to the intimidating crusading army. In reality, the Mongols likely spared most of Germany because their primary objective was to punish the Hungarian king for supporting the Cumans.

The Mongols raided eastern Austria and southern Moravia again in December 1241 and January 1242. A century later, in 1340, they raided the March of Brandenburg. Anti-Mongol crusades were preached within the Empire's borders several times between these two raids, and even as late as 1351.

== Background ==
Europe around 1230, showing Mongol incursions in the east

The general view in western Europe, since at least 1236, was that the Mongols' ultimate goal was the Holy Roman Empire. This was based partially on intelligence, but mainly on prevailing interpretations of apocalyptic literature. The arrival of the Mongols on the eastern border of the Empire presented the first serious external threat it had faced since the Hungarian invasions in the 10th century. The Empire was not well positioned to meet it. The emperor had been excommunicated since 1239 and the pope was arranging a political crusade against him in Italy.

In 1237, King Béla IV of Hungary received a Mongol ultimatum demanding his submission. According to Aubry of Trois-Fontaines, a similar ultimatum was received at the court of Emperor Frederick II in 1238, although this is not recorded by anyone else and no such document has survived. Frederick supposedly responded that he would gladly resign his crown if he could become the khan's falconer. The Annales Sancrucenses record that the Mongols also sent ambassadors to Duke Frederick II of Austria demanding his submission.

In his Chronica majora, Matthew of Paris records that rumours about the Mongols had spread into the empire by 1238, for which reason the fishmongers of Frisia were unwilling to go to England. He is also the source for the rumour that the Mongols were the Lost Tribes of Israel and were assisted by Jews smuggling arms out of Germany in wine barrels. The Jewish merchants were said to claim that the barrels were filled with poisoned wine for the invaders. Owing to these rumours, Jews were killed at several customs posts.

News of the Mongol invasion of Georgia reached the papal court in late 1239 or early 1240. Queen Rusudan and her son, the future King David VI, requested the preaching of a crusade, but Pope Gregory IX rejected the request on the grounds that the church was already overcommitted with crusades in Spain and the Levant as well as against heresy and apostasy in Occitania and Bosnia.

The Mongols entered Hungary on 12 March 1241. Béla IV immediately sent a letter requesting assistance to Duke Frederick. The duke arrived in Pest in the last weeks of March or the first week of April with a small contingent of poorly armed men. Frederick quickly won a small victory, killing two spies attached to the contingent under Shiban. Soon after the Cuman leader Köten was killed. Although the role of Frederick in this is uncertain, he left Pest not long after on bad terms with the Hungarian king.

Following the Battle of Mohi on 11 April 1241, the defeated king of Hungary fled to Austria, crossing the border at Pressburg. Initially welcomed by his erstwhile ally, Duke Frederick lured the king into the castle of Hainburg and extorted the repayment of an indemnity he had been forced to pay the king six years earlier. Béla handed over all the wealth he had with him, including the crown jewels, and was still forced to pawn three counties to the duke. These were probably the three westernmost counties of Moson, Sopron and Vas, which had large German populations. After he was freed, Béla headed for Croatia. At the same time, Béla sent a letter to King Louis IX of France requesting help and another to the Emperor Frederick offering to submit Hungary to the Empire in exchange for military support. The emperor responded in a letter that he could not assist until his quarrel with the pope was resolved and directed the Hungarian king to request aid from Conrad IV, who had formally been ruling Germany since 1237. The king, however, was a child of thirteen and power was exercised by Archbishop Siegfried of Mainz as Reichsgubernator.

== Incursions ==
=== Northeastern Germany ===
As early as 10 March 1241, Henry Raspe, Landgrave of Thuringia, wrote to Duke Henry II of Brabant (Note: After the battle of Legnica, the duke also received a hostage sent by the kings of Hungary and Rus'. The hostage, a Cuman, testified before the duke in Herk-de-Stad. The Jewish writer Moses ben Abraham has left the only account of his episode.) detailing the Mongols' movements across the border in Poland. An early form of the antemurale christianitatis ('bulwark of Christianity') metaphor is found in this letter, where Henry refers to Poland as his "wall". After the Battle of Chmielnik on 18 March 1241, the Polish duke Bolesław V fled to Moravia.

Following their victory over Duke Henry of Silesia in the Battle of Legnica on 9 April 1241, Mongol detachments entered the marches of Meissen and Lusatia in eastern Germany, advancing as far as the Elbe. Their attacks are recorded in the Annales sancti Pantaleonis, which states that "during their march they also crossed into the diocese of Meissen and slew many people there." According to a letter from Bartholomew of Trent to Bishop Egino of Brixen, the Mongols "attacked the borders of Bohemia and Saxony".

King Wenceslaus of Bohemia, who had raised an army of 40,000, retreated into Germany to join his forces with Thuringian and Saxon reinforcements. He avoided giving battle, although his cavalry may have beaten off the Mongol vanguard near Kladsko. He had earlier ordered the fortification of his major cities, including Prague, possibly in response to the report of the fall of Kiev in 1240. The fortification work is recorded in the Chronicle of Dalimil.

The Mongols did not continue their westward advance into Germany, but turned back east. They did not invade Bohemia. This has been attributed to their losses at Legnica being too heavy for them to confront the Bohemian army; to Wenceslaus' proximity from Legnica—he was only a day's march away—deterring the Mongols from pressing their luck; or to the mountains of the Bohemian Massif, which formed the natural northern boundary of Bohemia. According to Wenceslaus, who wrote letters to the princes of Germany informing them of the Mongols' progress, they were moving at a pace of 40 miles (64 km) per day away from the Bohemian border. At the Moravian Gate, they turned south and passed between the ranges of the Sudetes and Carpathians, entering Moravia near Opava.

=== Moravia ===
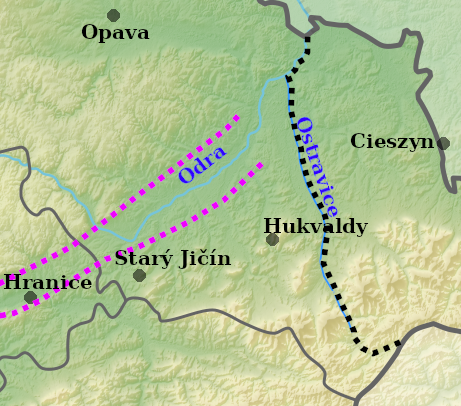
The Moravian Gate (pinked dotted lines) in eastern Moravia and the border of the Empire (black dotted line).

The Mongol army at Legnica had been under the command of Orda, Baidar and Kadan. It has been estimated at 8,000 strong. The army as it entered Moravia must have been somewhat smaller. Uriyangkhadai, the son of Subutai, was also at Legnica. According to the Chinese History of Yuan, the official history of the Mongol Yuan dynasty, Uriyangkhadai took part in the invasion of Poland and the land of the Nie-mi-sz', which word is derived from a name for Germans.

The Franciscan vice-minister in Bohemia, Jordan of Giano, (Note: Chambers calls his letter to the duke of Brabant and all Christians "the most accurate" report "which gave a detailed account of the Mongols' mobility, tactics and use of artillery".) who wrote letters from Prague while the Mongols were in Moravia, indicates that they had passed through the Moravian Gate before 9 May. Other sources place Orda in Hungary by late April, so the transit of Moravia seems to have lasted less than a month. (Note: According to Saunders, the transit of Moravia took about a month. Sodders has the Mongols still in Moravia on 7 May. Jackson has them entering Moravia only in the last week of April. Vercamer says that the Mongols remained in Poland and Moravia for less than two months (April–May) and estimates their transit of Moravia at 9–10 days.) The speed of the transit is mentioned by two other sources: Roger of Torre Maggiore remarks on it and the Annales sancti Pantaleonis note with hyperbole that, whereas it should have taken four days, the Mongols crossed Moravia in one day and night. The Mongols probably exited Moravia through the Hrozenkov pass, what Roger of Torre Maggiore calls the Hungarian Gate. The path they took through Moravia is unknown. They rejoined the main force under Batu Khan outside Trenčín in Hungary.

During their transit, the Mongols devastated all of Moravia "except for the castles and fortified places", according to the Annales sancti Pantaleonis. The only evidence relating to a specific place is a charter of 1247 in which Margrave Ottokar gave the city of Opava some privileges because of the damage the Mongols had caused in the region. All the other charters relating to the destruction of towns and monasteries were forged in the 19th century. (Note: Antonín Boček forged the charters for his Codex diplomaticus et epistolaris Moraviae, published at Olomouc in 1841. These charters show damage to the monasteries of Hradisko, Rajhrad and Doubravník and the cities of Brno, Bruntál, Benešov, Litovel, Jevíčko and Uničov. Jackson was taken in by these forgeries and mentions the sacks of Litovel, Bruntál and Jevíčko and the sieges of Brno, Olomouc and Uničov. Chambers, too, refers to the depopulation of Moravian towns that were resettled by German immigrants and received economic privileges.)

No archaeological evidence of the brief Mongol presence in Moravia has yet come to light, nor is Moravia mentioned explicitly in any eastern sources. According to Siegfried of Ballhausen, many Moravian refugees appeared in Meissen and Thuringia. Many others fled into the hills, woods and marshes and hid in caves. In a letter of 25 May, Bishop Henry of Constance urged the Franciscans to preach the crusade in his diocese because the Mongols had "attacked the borders of the Diocese of Mainz", referring to the dioceses of Prague and Olomouc, which were subject to Mainz.

=== Austria ===
The Mongol raiding parties entered Austria in late May or early June, either from Hungary or from Moravia on their way to rejoin the main Mongol army in Hungary. They did not cross the Danube in Austria, but they sacked Korneuburg to its north. The Mongols were probably in Austria as late as July, although already in that month Duke Frederick II was occupying the Hungarian counties that Béla IV had pawned him. (Note: In fact, his soldiers had gone beyond these and besieged Pressburg, which was defended by a count named Cosmos, and after his captured by another named Achilles. They also occupied Győr, but the inhabitants burnt the Austrian camp and forced them to retire.)

Duke Frederick detailed the situation in Austria in letters to the pope and the emperor. In a letter to Conrad IV dated 13 June 1241, he reports on the damage the Mongols inflicted on Austria and estimates that he killed 300 of them on the banks of the Morava. A week later, in a letter to Henry of Constance dated 22 or 23 June 1241, Frederick revises his estimate of casualties upwards to 700 and puts his own dead at 100. This incursion into Austria is also mentioned in the Annales Garstenses, Annales Zwetlenses and Annales Sancrucenses. The first two annals record that the Mongols left Austria unscathed, while the Sancrucenses assign them many dead.

Matthew of Paris quotes a letter from a certain Ivo of Narbonne, an eyewitness, who credits King Wenceslaus, Duke Frederick, Patriarch Berthold of Aquileia, Duke Bernard of Carinthia, Margrave Herman V of Baden and the "prince of Dalmatia" with the relief of Neustat from a besieging Mongol army that came from Hungary. Neustat is usually identified with Wiener-Neustadt. Such an attack is implausible but not impossible. The Mongols are not otherwise known to have crossed the Danube before the winter of 1241/42. It has been suggested that the enemy at Wiener-Neustadt was in fact a band of unruly Cumans who had left Hungary following the death of Köten. Neustat, however, may be the aforementioned Korneuburg.

Ivo describes the siege of Neustat and the ravaging of the countryside by the Mongols. He records that the garrison amounted to "no more than fifty knights along with twenty crossbowmen". The letter attributes cannibalism to the Mongols, although this appears to be an addition by Matthew of Paris, who is known to have added material of his own fabrication to his letters. They are said to have tortured and eaten civilians regardless of their age, sex, fortune or class. They ate deformed and old women right away, but beautiful women "they suffocated ... under a mass of rapists as they cried out and wailed." They cut the breasts off of virgins, reserving them for their leaders before eating the rest of their bodies. Ivo credits the prince of Dalmatia—possibly Duke Otto II of Merania—with capturing eight of the enemy, including an Englishman who had served the Mongols for years and under interrogation revealed much that was not previously known in the West.

The Tewkesbury Annals and the Chronique rimée of Philippe Mouskès report a victory over the Mongols by Duke Otto II of Bavaria, which nonetheless probably involved no more than a Mongol raiding party. In May 1241, with the Mongol threat still on his doorstep, Duke Otto of Bavaria expelled the Papal legate Albert von Behaim from Bavaria in an act of solidarity with Conrad IV and Frederick II amidst their conflict with the Papacy. In late May, Bishop Conrad of Freising wrote to Henry of Constance about the Mongol threat in the Danube valley. He reported that Wenceslaus was avoiding battle with the Mongols because he had been advised to do so by the king of Hungary.

A Mongol army entered western Hungary, eastern Austria and southern Moravia again in late December 1241, as recorded in a letter dated 4 January 1242 from a Benedictine abbot in Vienna, quoted by Matthew of Paris.

== Responses ==
=== Local response in April 1241 ===
A letter from the master of the French Templars to the French king at about this time noted that if the armies of Bohemia and Hungary "should be defeated, these Tartars will find no one to stand against them as far as" France. Baldwin of Ninove records that the Mongols caused panic in Flanders. The historian Peter Jackson agrees with the Templar master that had the Mongols launched a serious invasion of the Empire in the spring of 1241, "it is unlikely that they would have encountered coordinated opposition."

In response to the Mongol threat, German church leaders held several councils in April 1241, issuing calls for a crusade against the Mongols and enjoining fasting and processions for the defence of Germany and Bohemia. A princely assembly was held at Merseburg on 22 April to raise troops and coordinate efforts, according to the Sächsische Weltchronik and the Annales breves Wormatienses. (Note: The Weltchronik records that the assembly ordered a levy of troops: "All free men who could afford it should be summoned to arms. Those who could not afford it, should at least support their fellows." It was decreed that four free man must equip a fifth. The Annales report the taking of the cross as in a crusade: "The Tatars, against whom the princes at Merseberg are signed with the cross, destroyed the greater part of Hungary, Poland, Moravia and adjacent lands" (Tartari ... Hungariam Poloniam Moraviam et terras adiacentes in maxima parte destruxerunt, contra quos principes de Merseburg cruce signantur).) There is no record of who attended, (Note: Henry Raspe, Margrave Henry III of Meissen and Margraves John I and Otto III of Brandenburg may have been among them. Vercamer refers to the "well-known fretting of the eastern lords (like the dukes of Meißen, Thuringia and Brandenburg)".) but Duke Albert of Saxony and Bishop Conrad of Meissen had mustered an army and joined Wenceslaus at Königstein by 7 May. In late April, another assembly was held at Herford (or perhaps Erfurt) under the presidency of the acting regent in Germany, Archbishop Siegfried, but it did not lead to the formation of an army.

=== Emperor Frederick's response ===
Frederick II's domains—the Holy Roman Empire (bold border) and the kingdom of Sicily (pink)—at the time of the Mongol incursions

The ongoing quarrel between the excommunicated emperor and the pope hampered the imperial response to the arrival of the Mongols on the empire's eastern border. In May 1241, representatives of the emperor and the pope met to negotiate an end to their dispute in order to sustain a common front against the Mongols. The talks came to nothing. In Italy, Filippo da Pistoia, the bishop of Ferrara, circulated a letter he claimed to have received showing that the Emperor Frederick II had sent envoys to the Mongols and was in league with them. The pope's agents spread similar rumours in Germany. The Epistola prudenti viro, a false letter purportedly addressed to Frederick's astrologer Theodore of Antioch, was circulated in opposition to such claims.

The emperor remained in Italy throughout the crisis. From there, in either May or June, he sent a short list of seven instructions for countering the Mongol threat to Germany. He specifically ordered the use of crossbows, which were regarded as sparking terror in the Mongols, who did not possess the technology. The same advice was repeated a few years later in the Tartar Relation.

On 20 June in Faenza, the emperor issued the Encyclica contra Tartaros, an encyclical letter announcing the fall of Kiev, the invasion of Hungary and the threat to Germany, and requesting each Christian nation to devote its proper quota of men and arms to the defence of Christendom. According to Matthew of Paris's copy of the encyclical, it was addressed to the Catholic nations—France, Spain, Wales, Ireland, England, Swabia, Denmark, Italy, Burgundy, Apulia, Crete, Cyprus, Sicily, Scotland and Norway—each addressed according to its own national stereotype. Richard of San Germano states that copies were sent to all the princes of the West and quotes the start of the letter to the French king. In the encyclical, Frederick indicated he had accepted Hungarian submission. (Note: In 1245, Pope Innocent IV released Béla IV from his submission on the grounds that Frederick had not fulfilled its terms.)

On 3 July, Frederick II addressed a letter to his brother-in-law, King Henry III of England, informing him of the Mongol threat. The emperor had seemingly just received letters from Conrad IV, the kings of Hungary and Bohemia and the dukes of Austria and Bavaria informing him of the Mongols' progress. Béla IV's letter was delivered by Bishop Stephen of Vác, who carried another letter to Pope Gregory IX.

=== Conrad IV's anti-Mongol crusade ===
On the advice of the secular princes, Archbishop Siegfried promulgated instructions for the Dominicans and Franciscans to preach a crusade against the Mongols on 25 April, after the assembly in Herford. This was an unprecedent usurpation of what was by then a papal prerogative. Little seems to have come of it immediately. Preaching did take place in the archdioceses of Mainz, Cologne and Trier; the diocese of Constance and that of Augsburg, where Bishop Siboto commissioned the friars to preach; and the city of Strasbourg. According to the Annales sancti Pantaleonis, the crusade was preached throughout all of Germany by the Dominicans and Franciscans: "many friars Preachers and Minors ... have armed clergy and laity throughout almost all Germany against the aforesaid barbarians with the sign of the cross."

On 19 May, with the assistance of Siegfried, the 13-year-old Conrad IV held an assembly at Esslingen, where he took the vow of a crusader. His vow committed him only until 11 November 1241, although Béla IV warned him that the Mongols planned to invade Germany at the beginning of winter in 1241–42. At Esslingen, Conrad proclaimed a Landfrieden (territorial peace) for all of Germany so that forces could be concentrated against the Mongols. Bishops solicited donations for the cause throughout Germany.

Conrad IV set 1 July as the date for the army to assemble at Nuremberg. In June, Pope Gregory IX wrote to several bishops in Germany promoting the preaching of the crusade, retroactively authorizing what local authorities and the king had already begun. The abbot of Heiligenkreuz and the prior of the Dominicans in Vienna were also ordered to preach the crusade in their provinces. The Dominicans and Franciscans preached throughout Germany. According to the Annals of Stade, Gregory had received appeals for the full crusade indulgence from the dukes of Austria and Carinthia. On 19 June, referring to the letter he had received from Duke Frederick, he issued a formal indulgence for the defence of Germany and Bohemia, as he had three days earlier for Hungary.

Among those known to have taken a crusader's vow and joined the imperial army are Duke Otto of Brunswick, Archbishop Conrad of Cologne, Count Albert IV of Tyrol, Count Ulrich of Ulten and Count Louis of Helfenstein. The geographical spread of these names suggests that the call for a crusade was widely heeded across Germany. (Note: Sodders sees "the response to the preaching, and to the example set by Conrad, [as] widespread", with "numbers of fighting men from a huge swath of Germany [taking] crusading vows." Vercamer agrees that surviving private "charters from that time, from different issuers, show without a doubt that these royal orders were taken seriously." Jackson, on the other hand, sees "recruitment for the crusade among the nobility and knights of Germany and other regions further west" as "remarkably unimpressive.") In his letter of 13 June, Duke Frederick explained that he would not join the crusade because he was already engaged with the Mongols, whom he described as a "hurricane". He asked Conrad IV to have crossbows brought to Germany. He also advised him to bring knights from Swabia, Franconia, Bavaria and the Rhineland to Austria and direct the knights of Saxony, Meissen and Thuringia to Bohemia.

The crusader army assembled as planned at Nuremberg and had advanced as far as Weiden by 16 July. It is unclear if Conrad was marching toward Bohemia or Austria. By this time the Mongols were no longer threatening Germany and consequently the crusade broke up. It did not make contact with the Mongols. The latest indication that the crusade was ongoing is a charter issued by the count of Tyrol on 20 July.

According to the Chronicon Wormatiense and the Gesta Treverorum, most of the bishops and princes divided the money collected for the crusade between themselves. The exception was Bishop Landolf of Worms, who, according to the Chronicon, returned the donations after the crusade was called off. The rebellion of Conrad's regent in Germany, Siegfried of Mainz, who defected to the papal party, was probably the immediate cause of Conrad's decision to end the crusade. Although the crusade had not met the Mongols in battle, the Annales sancti Trudperti, followed by the Annales Zwifaltenses, attributes the Mongols' subsequent retreat from Europe to the intimidating German army. Nationalist modern historians in Germany or Austria have also fallen on such explanations. In reality, the Mongols probably did not invade Germany in force because their objective was merely to punish the Hungarian king for giving protection to the Cumans. (Note: "In 1241 they penetrated only to the eastern borders of Germany and Bohemia, perhaps because their principal objective on that occasion was to chastise the Hungarian king.")

=== Reports of victory ===
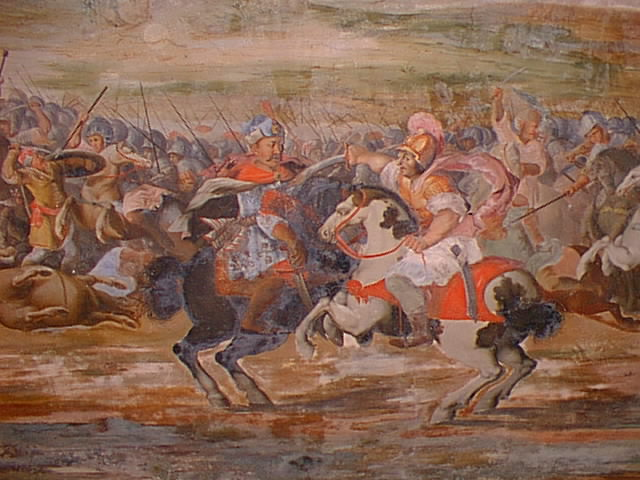
Legendary encounter of Yaroslav and Baidar. From a 19th-century fresco.

Despite the lack of contemporary evidence for a major German victory over the Mongols, the rumour that they had received such a check spread as far as Egypt, Armenia and Muslim Spain. It is recorded in the History of the Patriarchs of Alexandria and the Chronological History of Mekhitar of Ayrivank. The Flor des estoires de la terre d'Orient of Hayton of Corycus states that the duke of Austria and the king of Bohemia defeated the Mongols on the Danube and Batu drowned. The Liber secretorum fidelium crucis of Marino Sanudo the Elder also alludes to an Austrian victory on the Danube. The Kitāb al-jughrāfiyya of Ibn Saʿīd al-Maghribī records that a joint German–Hungarian army defeated the Mongols near Šibenik. Matthew of Paris claims that Conrad IV and his brother, King Enzo of Sardinia, defeated a Mongol army on the banks of the river Delpheos (possibly the Dnieper).

In later Moravian historiography, the Mongol invasion of 1241 was conflated with the Hungarian invasion of 1253, which was part of the War of the Babenberg Succession. On the latter occasion, the Hungarian army included pagan Cumans, who were confused with Mongols. The Hungarians besieged Olomouc. They defeated a relief army before lifting the siege. In the Czech Chronicle of Václav Hájek (1541), the Hungarian victory before Olomouc is transformed into a defeat and the leader of the Moravians is Jaroslav of Sternberg. The actual lord of Sternberg Castle at the time was Zdeslav, whose son Jaroslav was probably too young to participate in military action. In the History of the Kingdom of Bohemia of Johannes Dubravius (1552), the siege of Olomouc is moved to 1241 and attributed to the Mongols. Jaroslav of Sternberg was transformed into a national hero who defeated the Mongols before Olomouc and killed Baidar in the Dvůr Králové manuscript literary hoax in the 19th century. In fact, Baidar was still alive in 1246.

== Later crusades ==
Pope Innocent IV called for a crusade against the Mongols to be preached in Germany in August 1243 and throughout Bohemia and Moravia in the spring of 1253. In June 1258, Pope Alexander IV called for another crusade to be preached in Germany, Bohemia and Moravia. In June 1265, Clement IV, in response to a report he received from Béla IV, ordered the preaching of a new crusade against the Mongols in Austria, Bohemia, Brandenburg, Carinthia and Styria within the Holy Roman Empire.

The crusade against the Mongols was rarely promoted thereafter. In 1288, Nicholas IV ordered it preached in Bohemia. John of Winterthur reports attacks on the March of Brandenburg during the Mongol invasion of Poland in 1340. It was also rumoured at that time that the Mongols intended to attack Bohemia, according to the Historia Parmensis of John of Cornazzano. According to Francis of Prague, the Emperor Louis IV refused to aid Poland, but Galvano Fiamma says that "numerous Germans" joined the defence of Poland, as did the king of Bohemia, John the Blind. Benedict XII, responding to a request from King Casimir III of Poland, ordered the crusade preached in Bohemia in 1340. In March 1351, Clement VI authorised Polish clergy to preach the crusade against the Mongols in Bohemia for the defence of Poland.

== Sources ==
- Abulafia, David (1988). Frederick II: A Medieval Emperor. Allen Lane.
- Andrea, Alfred J., ed. (2020). The Medieval Record: Sources of Medieval History (2nd rev. ed.). Hackett.
- Bárány, Attila (2024). "The Response of the West to the Mongol Invasion (1241–1270)". In Balázs Nagy (ed.). The Mongols in Central Europe: The Profile and Impact of Their Thirteenth-Century Invasions (PDF). ELTE Eötvös Kiadó. pp. 43–81.
- Bretschneider, Emil (1888). Mediaeval Researches from Eastern Asiatic Sources: Fragments Towards the Knowledge of the Geography and History of Central and Western Asia from the 13th to the 17th Century. Vol. 1. Trübner & Co.
- Burnett, Charles F. S. (1984). "An Apocryphal Letter from the Arabic Philosopher al-Kindi to Theodore, Frederick II's Astrologer, Concerning Gog and Magog, the Enclosed Nations, and the Scourge of the Mongols". Viator. 15: 151–167. doi:10.1484/J.VIATOR.2.301438.
- Chambers, James (1979). The Devil's Horsemen: The Mongol Invasion of Europe. Book Club Associates.
- Coulter, Matthew (2022). "Patterns of Communication During the 1241 Mongol Invasion of Europe: Insights from the Ottobeuren Letter Collection". Journal of Medieval History. 48 (4): 496–523. doi:10.1080/03044181.2022.2101020. S2CID 250971115.
- Giessauf, Johannes (1997). "Herzog Friedrich II von Österreich und die Mongolengefahr 1241/42". In H. Ebner; W. Roth (eds.). Forschungen zur Geschichte des Alpen-Adria-Raumes. Graz. pp. 173–199 [1–30].
- Jackson, Peter (1991). "The Crusade Against the Mongols (1241)". The Journal of Ecclesiastical History. 42: 1–18. doi:10.1017/S0022046900002554. S2CID 162901596.
- Jackson, Peter (2005). The Mongols and the West, 1221–1410. Routledge.
- Kantorowicz, Ernst (1931). Frederick the Second, 1194–1250. Translated by E. O. Lorimer. Frederick Ungar.
- Kosi, Miha (2018). "The Fifth Crusade and its Aftermath: Crusading in the Southeast of the Holy Roman Empire in the First Decades of the Thirteenth Century". Crusades. 17: 91–113. doi:10.1080/28327861.2018.12220508.
- Loud, Graham A. (2013). "The Royal Chronicle of Cologne, 1222–49" (PDF). Institute for Medieval Studies. University of Leeds.
- Lower, Michael (2023). "Gregory IX and the Crusades". In Damian J. Smith (ed.). Pope Gregory IX (1227–1241): Power and Authority. Amsterdam University Press. pp. 127–150.
- Papp Reed, Zsuzsanna (2022). Matthew Paris on the Mongol Invasion in Europe. Brepols.
- Pow, Stephen (2024). "Ivo of Narbonne's Account of a Mongol Attack on Austria: Fact or Fiction?". In Balázs Nagy (ed.). The Mongols in Central Europe: The Profile and Impact of Their Thirteenth-Century Invasions (PDF). ELTE Eötvös Kiadó. pp. 105–139.
- Rachetta, Maria Theresa (2020). "Paris 1244: The Jews, the Christians, and the Tartars: The Livre of Moses ben Abraham, a Little-Known Case of Jewish Apologetics in Medieval French". Medium Ævum. 89 (2): 244–266. doi:10.2307/27089790. JSTOR 27089790.
- Saunders, J. J. (1971). The History of the Mongol Conquests. Routledge & Kegan Paul. ISBN 9780710070739.
- Scales, Len (2012). The Shaping of German Identity: Authority and Crisis, 1245–1414. Cambridge University Press.
- Sodders, Daniel R. (1996). Conrad the Fourth as German King, 1237–1250 (PhD dissertation). University of Kansas.
- Somer, Tomáš (2018). "Forging the Past: Facts and Myths Behind the Mongol Invasion of Moravia in 1241". Golden Horde Review. 6 (2): 238–251. doi:10.22378/2313-6197.2018-6-2.238-251.
- Somer, Tomáš (2021). "The Bohemian Kingdom and the Mongol 'Invasion' of 1241". In Alexander V. Maiorov; Roman Hautala (eds.). The Routledge Handbook of the Mongols and Central-Eastern Europe: Political, Economic, and Cultural Relations. Routledge. pp. 119–133.
- Tattersall, Jill (1988). "Anthropophagi and Eaters of Raw Flesh in French Literature of the Crusade Period: Myth, Tradition and Reality". Medium Ævum. 57 (2): 240–253. doi:10.2307/43629210. JSTOR 43629210.
- Vercamer, Grischa (2021). "The Mongol Invasion in the Year 1241—Reactions among European Rulers and Consequences for East Central European Principalities". Zeitschrift für Ostmitteleuropa-Forschung. 70 (2): 227–262. doi:10.25627/202170210926.
- Wilson, Peter (2016). Heart of Europe: A History of the Holy Roman Empire. Belknap Press.
