= Apostolici =

Apostolici may refer to:

- Apostolici, Apostolic Brethren, or Apostles, names given to various Christian sects whose common doctrinal feature was an ascetic rigidity of morals. These included:
  - The Apostolic Brethren, a Christian sect founded in northern Italy in the latter half of the 13th century by Gerard Segarelli.
- Apostolici Regiminis was a papal bull issued 19 December 1513 by Pope Leo X, not to be confused with:
- Regiminis Apostolici was a papal bull promulgated by Pope Alexander VII in 1665.
- Apostolici Ministerii was a papal bull issued 23 May 1724 by Pope Innocent XIII for the revival of ecclesiastical discipline in Spain.
- Ab apostolici was a papal encyclical promulgated by Leo XIII on 15 October 1890.
- Cursores apostolici was the Latin title of the ecclesiastical heralds or pursuivants pertaining to the papal court.
- Historia Certaminis Apostolici is a book that was traditionally ascribed to Abdias of Babylon.
