= Egno von Eppan =

Biography of Egno von Eppan

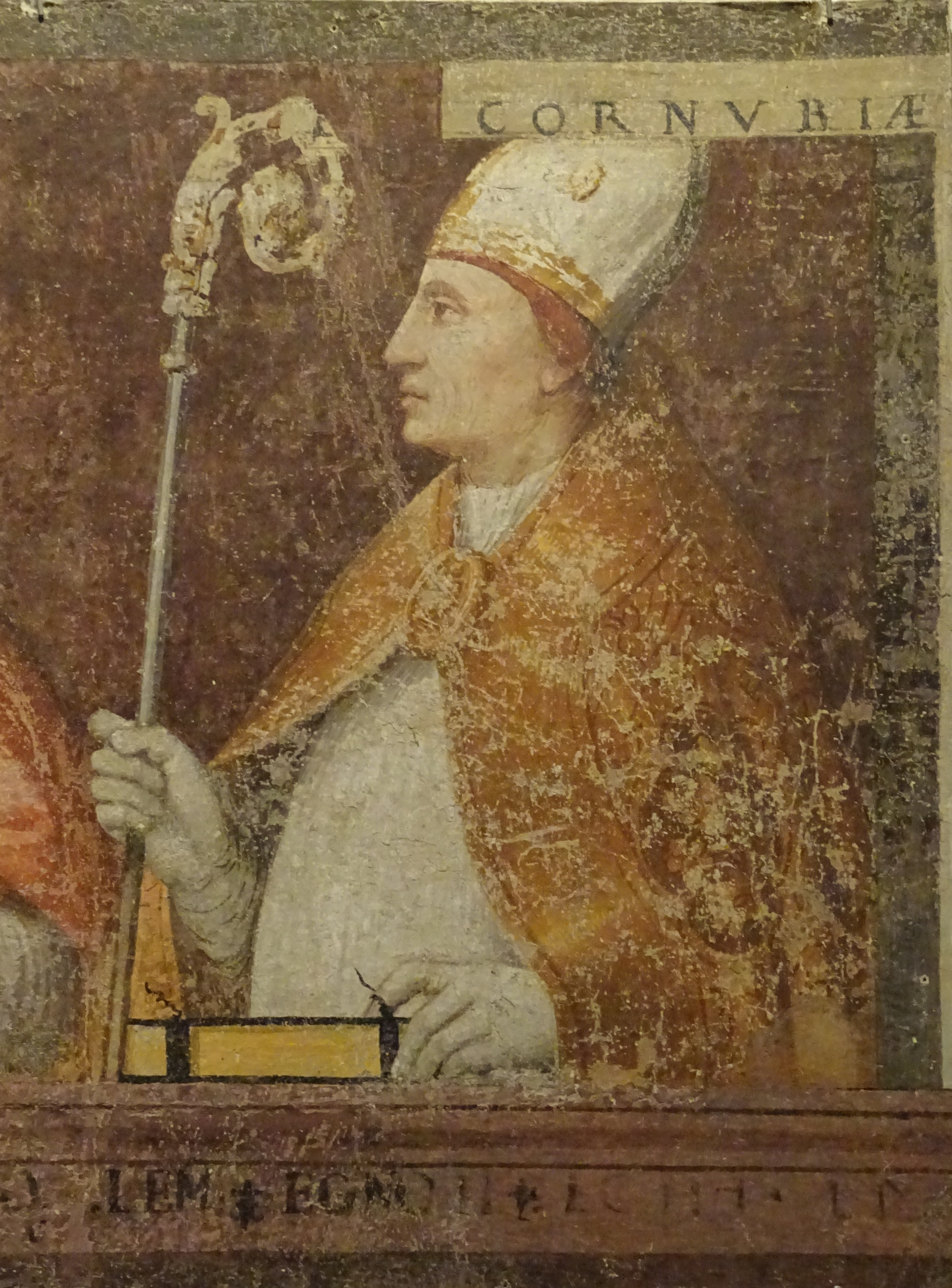
Egno von Eppan, 16th-century fresco in the Buonconsiglio Castle by Marcello Fogolino

Egno von Eppan (died 25 May 1273) was the bishop of Brixen from 1240 to 1250, and then bishop of Trent until his death.

Egno belonged to the family of the counts of Eppan. He became a canon of the cathedral of Trent as an acolyte in 1232 and became a subdeacon in 1234. Bishop Henry died on 18 November 1239 and by 8 April 1240 Egno had been elected to succeed him. He was probably chosen by the canons in the hope that his family might help the church resist the counts of Andechs, Gorizia and Tyrol. He received the regalia from King Conrad IV in Nördlingen on 20 May 1240.

At Nördlingen, Conrad IV granted Egno a privilege stating that nobody could cross the duchy of Brixen without the permission of either the emperor, the king or the bishop. At the same time, Egno entered into a business deal with Conrad's important advisor, Conrad of Winterstetten. Thus, during the papal war against the Emperor Frederick II, which began in 1239, Egno supported the Emperor. He allied with Duke Bernard of Carinthia against the counts of Gorizia and Tyrol. He controlled the Brenner Pass, the most important pass between Germany and Italy. A letter written by Albert von Behaim confirms that Egno had closed the passes by September 1240, greatly hampering communication between the Pope and his German allies.

The Mongol threat to the Empire in 1241–1242 provided Egno with a respite from these quarrels. On 20 March 1241, a preliminary agreement was reached between Egno and Counts Meinhard I of Gorizia and Albert IV of Tyrol. On 30 April, in the presence of Patriarch Berthold, a final agreements was signed at Patriasdorf. The timing of these agreements suggests that they may have been made in response to news of the Mongols. A letter addressed to Egno from Bartholomew of Trent provides valuable information on the Mongols' movements. Conrad IV's crusade against the Mongols was preached in the diocese of Brixen, and even the Count Albert IV took the cross.

In April 1245, Egno was in Vienna aiding the negotiations between the Emperor and Duke Frederick II of Austria for the former's marriage to the latter's niece, Gertrude. He joined the Emperor's court in Verona by June 1245. On 4 June 1246, Pope Innocent IV summoned Egno to appear before him and, on 25 July, he was excommunicated by the papal legate Filippo da Pistoia for failing to obey a summons from Henry Raspe, anti-king in Germany. Before the end of the year, he made his submission to the Pope and changed sides. He was then placed under the imperial ban.

On 8 March 1247, Egno was appointed administrator of the diocese of Trent. In 1250, he was transferred there as bishop and succeeded at Brixen by Bruno. He now found himself allied with Count Albert IV and the counts of Gorizia, on whom he bestowed fiefs and offices in his gift. He had to fight the podestà Sodeger de Tito and Ezzelino III da Romano for control of his bishopric. The death of Ezzelino in 1259 brought respite to Egno, but in 1265 he faced a rebellion in Trent and had to flee to Riva del Garda. Count Meinhard I took control of the bishopric.

On 21 April 1263, Egno enfeoffed Louis II, Duke of Bavaria, with the fiefs that had escheated to the bishopric on the death of Count Siboto VI of Falkenstein. He spent most of his later years in Bozen. He died on 25 May 1273 in Padua.
