= Crato =

Crato may refer to:

== Places ==
- Crato, Portugal
- Crato, Ceará, Brazil

== People ==
- Crato, Count of Nassau-Saarbrücken (1621–1642), German nobleman
- Louis Crato, Count of Nassau-Saarbrücken (1663– 1713), German nobleman
- Johannes Crato von Krafftheim (1519–1585), German humanist and physician,
- Pseudo-Crato, the supposed author of a history of the apostles Simon and Judas
- Nuno Crato (born 1952), Portuguese mathematician and economist

== Other uses ==
- Crato Formation, a geological formation of Early Cretaceous age in northeastern Brazil's Araripe Basin
