= Feud letter =

Document in which a feud was announced

A feud letter (German: Fehdebrief or Absagebrief) was a document in which a feud was announced, usually with few words, in medieval Europe. The letter had to be issued three days in advance to be legally valid.

To prevent the feud from becoming a case of murder and thus become punishable by law, those involved had to abide by the following rules:

1. The feud, whether between knights or between the nobility and towns, had to be initiated by a formal feud letter.
2. Killing innocent parties was forbidden.
3. Razing of houses and laying waste to the land were allowed.
4. During the feud, fighting was not permitted in churches or at home, and the parties were to be allowed to go to and to return from church or court without being molested.

== Examples ==
Around 1444, the town of Soest declared war on the Archbishop of Cologne at the start of the Soest Feud with the following famous, brief feud letter:

"Wettet, biscop Dierich van Moeres, dat wy den vesten Junker Johan van Cleve lever hebbet alls Juwe, unde wert Juwe hiermit affgesaget"
("Know this, Bishop Dietrich of Moers, that we prefer the steadfast Junker, John of Cleves, to you, and hereby give you notice thereof.")

== See also ==
- Throw down the gauntlet
- Landfrieden - waiver of the right to feuding
- Declaration of war
