= Synod of Würzburg (1287) =

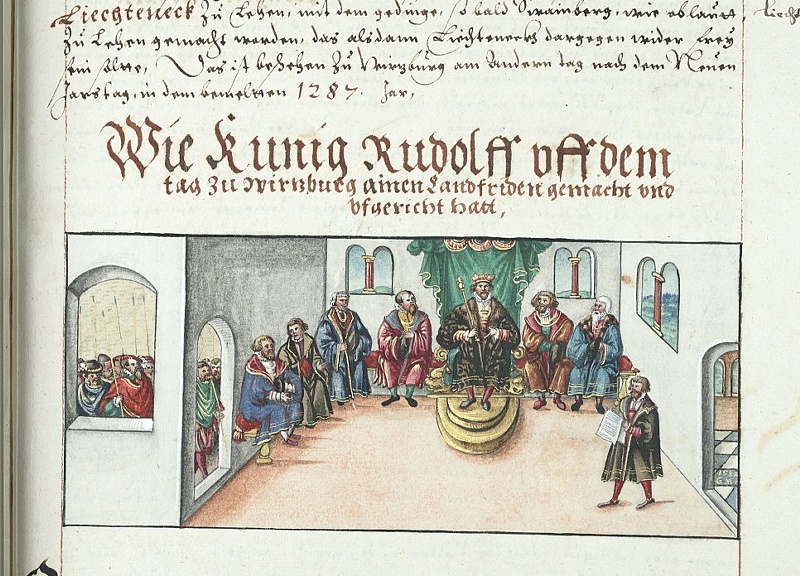
Illustration of the diet of Würzburg in Die Würzburger Bischofs-Chronik of Lorenz Fries, 16th century

The Council of Würzburg (Latin: Concilium Herbipolense), also called the Synod of Würzburg or Diet of Würzburg, was a simultaneous church council and royal diet held in Würzburg in March 1287.

== Background ==
The council and diet were convoked in February 1287 by Cardinal Giovanni Boccamazza, the legate of Pope Honorius IV in Germany, and King Rudolf I for 9 March 1287. Giovanni had come to Germany at the request of King Rudolf, whose planned trip to Rome to obtain the imperial crown had been delayed. One of the main purposes of the council, therefore, was to secure funding for the coronation among other things. The anticipated financial demands of the legate engendered strong opposition within the German episcopate, led by the archbishop of Cologne, Siegfried II.

Siegfried circulated a document outlining the case against the legate and probably intended for an appeal to Rome. The legate was accused of trying to sever the Kingdom of Germany from the Holy Roman Empire and set up a hereditary king, thus negating the rights of the prince electors, which had been recognized by Innocent III in the decretal Venerabilem (1202). Rumours of threats to the electors were also recorded in the Annales breves Wormatienses.

== Council and statutes ==
The council opened a week late on 16 March 1287 in the cathedral of Würzburg. It was attended by bishops from the ecclesiastical provinces of Aquileia, Mainz, Cologne, Trier, Salzburg, Bremen, Magdeburg, Besançon and Regensburg.

During the first ordinary session on 18 March, the statutes were promulgated. These were 42 canons mainly dealing with disciplinary matters. Unlike the other main business of the council, these met with no opposition. They were based on the decrees of the Lateran council of 1179 and the council of Lyon of 1274. Canon 7 forbade the holding of two masses in one day. Canon 15 forbade clergy to charge for officiating marriages and funerals. Canon 28 forbade the fortification of church's without the bishop's permission.

During the second session on 26 March, the cardinal announced the taxation of clergy to finance Rudolf's trip to Rome and imperial coronation. It is not clear from the surviving sources how much money the legate demanded. According to some German sources, he asked for a quarter of all income to be paid over four years. Siegfried of Cologne read out a letter of protest. The bishop of Toul, Konrad Probus, climbed onto the font to rant at the pope's exorbitant exactions he was asked to pay in both France and Germany.

After the second session, the council broke up in disorder. The cardinal's mandate ended with the death of Honorius IV on 3 April. Rudolf gave the legate a safeconduct to protect him from repercussions. By 7 April, Giovanni was in Worms.

In connection with the council, numerous letters of indulgence were issued to recipients throughout the empire, mainly to monasteries, cathedrals and hospitals.

== Diet and peace ==
The royal diet opened a week late, simultaneously with the council. Rudolf I had the assembled princes swear to maintain the public peace (Landfrieden) throughout the empire for a period of three years. Rudolf envisage this peace enforced by judges operated on a regional basis in concert with the princes. The origin of the system of imperial circles, only fully realized in 1500, is usually located in Rudolf's peace plan. Following the diet, he issued a recess in German proclaiming the peace. This was only the second such empire-wide peace since the Peace of Mainz of 1235. Because the recess is one of the earliest royal acts drawn up in the vernacular, it gave rise to later traditions that Rudolf made German the legal language of Germany in preference to Latin, but this is not the case.

On 27 March, Rudolf asked the legate on behalf of the diet to excommunicate all rebels who had been under the imperial ban for a year, including Count Guy of Flanders.

== Bibliography ==
- Emerton, Ephraim (1917). The Beginnings of Modern Europe, 1250–1450. Ginn and Company.
- Erkens, Franz-Reiner (2011). "Ein Drache in Würzburg: Die Reichssynode und der Hoftag von 1287". Zeitschrift für Kirchengeschichte. 122: 153–172.
- Gaisberg-Schöckingen, Georg Freiherr von (1928). Das Konzil und der Reichstag zu Würzburg im Jahre 1287. J. Fink.
- Kelly, J. N. D.; Walsh, Michael J., eds. (2010). "Honorius IV". A Dictionary of Popes (2nd ed.). Oxford University Press. ISBN 978-0-19-929581-4.
- Kern, Léon (1955). "À propos des lettres d'indulgence collectives concédées au concile de Wurzbourg de 1287". Schweizer Beiträge zur Allgemeinen Geschichte. 13: 111–129.
- Krafl, Pavel (2021). "Würzburg Legatine Statutes of 1287 and the Kingdom of Bohemia". Temas Medievales. 29 (2): 1–26.
- Krenig, Ernst-Günter (2007). "Das "Nationalkonzil" im Dom zu Würzburg im März des Jahres 1287". Mainfränkisches Jahrbuch für Geschichte und Kunst. 59: 9–14.
- Leuschner, Joachim (1980). Germany in the Late Middle Ages. Translated by Sabine MacCormack. North-Holland Publishing Company.
- Maleczek, Werner (2013). "Die Urkunden des päpstlichen Legaten Johannes Boccamazza, Kardinalbischofs von Tusculum, aus den Jahren 1286 und 1287 (Legation ins Reich in der Spätzeit König Rudolfs von Habsburg)" (PDF). Archiv für Diplomatik. 59: 35–132.
- McClintock, John; Strong, James, eds. (1887). "Wurzburg (or Wurtzburg), Council of". Cyclopædia of Biblical, Theological and Ecclesiastical Literature: Supplement, Vol. II. Mc Clintock and Strong cyclopaedia. Harper and Brothers. p. 998. hdl:2027/hvd.ah3cvd. ISBN 9780837017464.
- Pawlicki, Bernhard (1896). Papst Honorius IV: Eine Monographie. Bonn: P. Hauptmann. ISBN 9780837080901.
- Redlich, Oswald (1903). Rudolf von Habsburg: Das deutsche Reich nach dem Untergange des alten Kaisertums. Verlag der Wagner'schen Universitäts-Buchhandlung.
- Scales, Len (2012). The Shaping of German Identity: Authority and Crisis, 1245–1414. Cambridge University Press.
- Stubbs, William (1908). Germany in the Later Middle Ages, 1200–1500. Longmans.
- Walter, Ingeborg (1969). "Boccamazza, Giovanni". Dizionario Biografico degli Italiani, Volume 11: Boccadibue–Bonetti (in Italian). Rome: Istituto dell'Enciclopedia Italiana. ISBN 978-8-81200032-6.
- Wilson, Peter H. (2016). Heart of Europe: A History of the Holy Roman Empire. Belknap Press.
