= Bartholomew of Trent =

Dominican hagiographer and papal diplomat (c. 1200 – 1251)

Bartholomew of Trent (c. 1200 – 1251) was a Dominican hagiographer and papal diplomat. His Epilogum in gesta sanctorum (Afterword on the Deeds of the Saints), which set a new style in hagiography designed for practical use by preachers, specifically to inspire a lay audience with marvels and moral admonitions, was one of two main sources for Jacobus de Voragine's compendium, Golden Legend.

A native of Trent, he entered the Dominican Order in Bologna. Bartholomew travelled widely in Italy, France and Germany; politically astute, was often in attendance at both the Papal and Imperial courts. He served as Pope Innocent IV's envoy in negotiations with Frederick II. He knew Anthony of Padua and was present at the translation of St. Dominic's body in 1233, for the details of which he is a prime witness. In 1241, he was a witness to Mongol raids in Saxony, which he wrote about in a letter to Bishop Egino of Brixen.

The Epilogum in gesta sanctorum was completed in the Monastery of San Lorenzo, at Trent, in 1245. The modern edition is that of Emore Paoli (Sismel, Edizioni del Galluzzo, 2001), superseding that of D. Gobbi (1990), transcribing a manuscript from Klosterneuburg.

At one point "in the first half of the thirteenth century, Bartholomew of Trent recounted a number of apparitions of the archangel Michael" that embellished the story of Pope Gregory's famous letania septiformis created to quell the plague of 590 caused by the overflowing of the river Tiber in Rome. The final account was published in 1270 when "Jacobus de Voragine put all the pieces together in his wildly popular Legenda aurea." The text concludes, "Then Gregory saw an angel of the lord standing atop the castle of Crescentius, wiping a bloody sword and sheathing it. Gregory understood that the plague had ceased, as indeed, happened. Following from which the castle was called the Castle of the Angel." The statue of an angel atop Rome's Castel Sant'Angelo overlooking the city remains to this day.
