= Apostolici (sects) =

Apostolici, Apostolic Brethren, or Apostles, are the names given to various Christian heretics, whose common doctrinal feature was an ascetic rigidity of morals, which made them reject property and marriage.

== Anatolian origins ==
The earliest Apostolici appeared in Phrygia, Cilicia, Pisidia and Pamphylia towards the end of the 2nd century or the beginning of the 3rd. According to the information given by Epiphanius about the doctrines of these heretics, it is evident that they were connected with the Encratites and the Tatianians. They condemned individual property, hence the name sometimes given to them of Apotactites or Renuntiatores. They preserved an absolute chastity and abstained from wine and meat. They refused to admit into their sect those Christians whom the fear of martyrdom had once restored to paganism. As late as the 4th century St. Basil knew some Apostolici. After that period they disappeared, either becoming completely extinct, or being confounded with other sects.

== Latin heretics ==
Failing a more exact designation, the name of Apostolici has been given to certain groups of Latin heretics of the 12th century. It is the second of the two sects of Cologne (the first being composed very probably of Cathari) that is referred to in the letter addressed in 1146 by Everwin, provost of Steinfeld, to St. Bernard. They condemned marriage (save, perhaps, first marriages), the eating of meat, infant baptism, veneration of saints, fasting, prayer for the dead and belief in purgatory, denied transubstantiation, declared the Catholic priesthood worthless, and considered the whole church of their time corrupted by the negotia saecularia (Latin for 'wordliness') which absorbed all its zeal. They do not seem to have been known as "Apostles" or "Apostolici": St Bernard, in fact, asks his hearers: "Quo nomine istos titulove censebis?" ("What do you think they call themselves?"). Under this designation, too, are included the heretics of Périgueux in France, alluded to in the letter of a certain monk Heribert. Heribert says merely: "Se dicunt apostolicam vitam ducere" ("They say they lead the apostolic life"). It is possible that they were Henricians (followers of Henry of Lausanne). During his mission in the south-east of France in 1146–1147 St. Bernard still met disciples of Henry of Lausanne in the environs of Périgueux. The heretics of whom Heribert speaks condemned riches, denied the value of the sacraments and of good works, ate no meat, drank no wine and rejected the veneration of images. Their leader, named Pons, gathered round him nobles, priests, monks and nuns.

== Apostolic Brethren ==
In the second half of the 13th century the Order of the Apostles or Apostle Brethren appeared in Italy. The order was founded about 1260 by a young workman from the environs of Parma, Gerard Segarelli. His followers had to live in absolute poverty, chastity and idleness. They begged, and preached penitence. The councils of Würzburg (1287) and Chichester (1289) took measures against the Apostles of Germany and England. But in 1291 the sect reappeared and increased, and were persecuted pitilessly. Four were burned in 1294, and Segarelli, as a relapsed heretic, went to the stake at Parma in 1300.

Dolcino of Novara had been an Apostle since 1291. He fell into the hands of the Inquisition, and recanted, three times. But after Segarelli's death he gave himself out as an angel sent from God to elucidate the prophecies. Soon he founded an Apostolic congregation at whose head he placed himself. Pope Clement V directed a crusade against the sect, and on 23 March 1307 they were overcome, but continued their propaganda well into the 14th century.

== Later sects ==
Several controversialists have mentioned among the innumerable sects that have sprung from Anabaptism a group of individuals whose open-air preaching and rigorous practice of poverty gained them the name of Apostolici. These must be distinguished from the similarly named but equally rigid Apostoolians, Mennonites of Frisia, who followed the teachings of the pastor Samuel Apostool (1638–beginning of 18th century).
