= Pseudo-Crato =

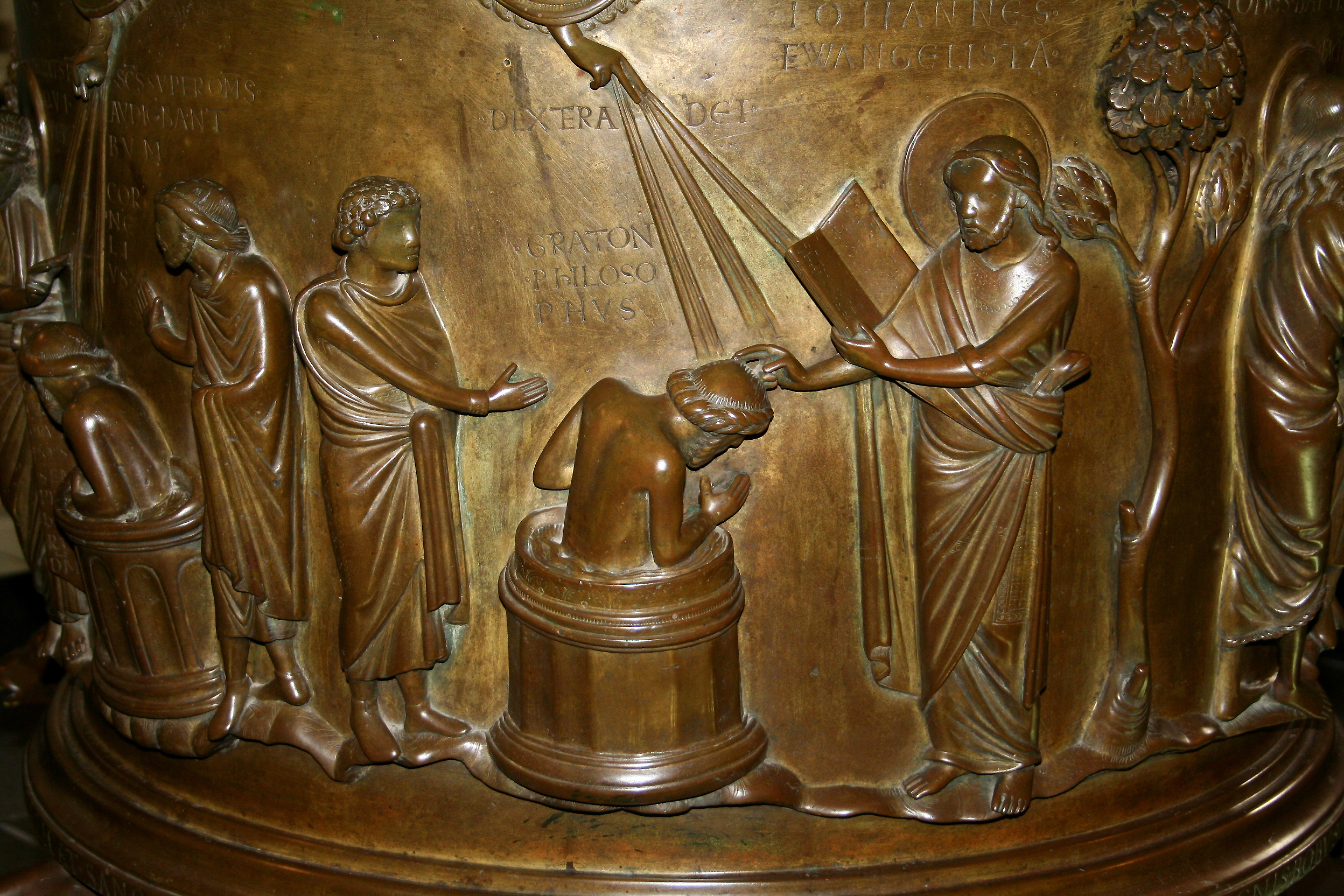
Depiction of John the Evangelist baptizing the Greek philosopher Crato on the Liege baptismal font by Renier de Huy

Pseudo-Crato or Pseudo-Craton is the name given by modern scholarship to a figure named 'Craton' in Book 6 (6.20) of Pseudo-Abdias' ten-volume pseudepigraphical and apocryphal histories of the apostles. (Note: Pseudo-Abdias' ten-volume apocrypha has been published under various titles, including 'History of Apostolic Struggle' (Historia Certaminis Apostolici) and as 'Apostolic Histories' (Historiae Apostolicae). In 1719, in the second volume of Codex Apocryphus Novi Testamenti, Johann Albert Fabricius published it under the general heading Acta Apostolorum Apocrypha, sive Historia Certaminis Apostolici adscripta Abdiae ("The apocryphal Acts of the Apostles, or, the History of the Apostolic Struggle ascribed to Abdias"),'"`UNIQ--ref-00000000-QINU`"' commonly shortened to "Pseudo-Abdias" due to the preface's pseudepigraphical attribution of authorship (see above). "There is certainly no trace in the whole of ecclesiastical antiquity of the existence of such a work as these Acts or Histories of the Apostles by an author so named [i.e. Abdias]."'"`UNIQ--ref-00000001-QINU`"') It is unclear whether Craton and the work credited to him by Pseudo-Abdias actually existed, or whether this Craton was invented to lend the pseudepigrapha greater legitimacy.

Pseudo-Abdias' ten-volume histories, which -- due to references to events in the year 524 -- cannot be from before the 6th-century, includes a preface purportedly written by the early 3rd-century chronicler Julius Africanus. The preface claims that the entire ten-volume histories were written by one Abdias, who supposedly had been personally acquainted with the apostles, and who had been consecrated as the first Bishop of Babylon by the apostles Simon and Jude. The preface also claims that Abdias wrote the histories in Hebrew, and that these were then translated into Greek by a disciple of Abdias' named Eutropius. Eutropius' translation was then supposedly retranslated into Latin by Africanus.

In Book 6, a certain Craton -- ostensibly another disciple of Abdias -- is associated with the histories' sections on Simon and Jude, i.e. the same apostles that supposedly made Abdias the Bishop of Babylon. According to the text, this Craton had also written a ten-volume history of the apostles, which in turn had also been translated into Latin by Africanus. "Critics have long before Fabricius [i.e. the 1719 publication of Pseudo-Abdias] disputed all of these sorts of claims in the text; [the text] can in no way be related to any historical Abdias, Eutropius, or Craton, or to Julius Africanus." A bishop of Babylon named Abdias is also unknown. And because Julius Africanus wrote in Greek, not Latin, by the 19th century the Pseudo-Abdias' story of 'Craton' and his work were generally considered a fabrication. Lipsius additionally insisted that Pseudo-Craton, and not Pseudo-Abdias, should be given credit for the histories.

A Craton associated with the apostles Simon and Jude is known briefly from other works, such as the 5th/6th century Coptic Acts of Bartholomew. Pseudo-Abdias' text also refers to another Craton in Book 4, which deals with the apostle John; this other Craton is called "the philosopher" and was supposedly one of John's disciples at Ephesus.
