= Landfrieden =

Contractual waiver in Holy Roman medieval law

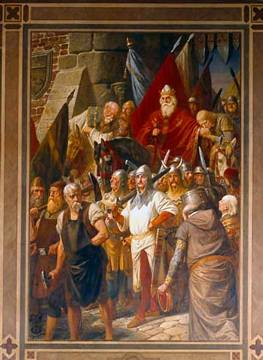
Henry IV proclaims the 1103 Landfrieden in Mainz, painting by Hermann Wislicenus, Imperial Palace of Goslar (c. 1880)

Under the law of the Holy Roman Empire, a Landfrieden or Landfriede (Latin: constitutio pacis, pax instituta or pax jurata, variously translated as "land peace", or "public peace") was a contractual waiver of the use of legitimate force, by rulers of specified territories, to assert their own legal claims. This especially affected the right of feuding.

== Scope ==
Landfrieden agreements formed the political basis for pursuing claims without resorting to the private use of violence. They also often regulated the jurisdiction and thus allowed the settlement of disputes through judgements based on a common set of rules.

Offences or violations of the public peace were liable to severe punishment. For example, objects or buildings (such as churches, homes, mills, agricultural implements, bridges, and especially imperial roads) and people (priests, pilgrims, merchants, women, even farmers, hunters and fishermen in carrying out their work) could be placed under protection. The Landfrieden created a type of martial law, as well as special courts, the Landfriedensgerichte.

Some scholars have argued that the concept of Landfrieden applied both to peace-keeping associations and to the late medieval and early modern laws and ordinances which sought to restrict feuding and violence across large parts of the Holy Roman Empire, or the Empire as a whole. The historian Duncan Hardy has interpreted Landfrieden as a discursive strategy, marked out by appeals to widely used concepts of peace, justice, and honor and the defense of travelers in a shared locality and on the imperial roads. Political actors ranging from the kings and emperors of the Romans to local German nobles and towns might employ this discourse to legitimize themselves and signal their belonging to an imperial layer of governance within the Holy Roman Empire.

== Development ==
In the High Middle Ages, from the 11th century onwards, the Landfrieden movement strove to extend the so-called Peace and Truce of God (Gottesfrieden). The first imperial Landfriede was established by Holy Roman Emperor Henry IV in 1103 for a term of four years and was known as the First Imperial Peace of Mainz (Erster Mainzer Reichslandfriede). It followed the Mainz Peace and Truce of God (Mainzer Gottesfrieden), which he had already proclaimed in 1085.

In 1152, Frederick Barbarossa proclaimed the Great Imperial Peace (Großer Reichslandfrieden), which extended to the whole Empire. This act of constitution brought into effect a time-limited alliance of ruling princes. It was established in 1186 that a feud had to be announced in feud letter issued three days in advance. Originating from the law schools in Bologna and Pavia, the concepts of medieval Roman law (Corpus Juris Civilis) started to dominate the legal profession under Barbarossa's rule.

The crucial Imperial Peace of Mainz (Mainzer Landfriede, also Mainzer Reichslandfrieden) announced by Frederick II, Holy Roman Emperor at the Imperial Diet of 1235 was more like a legal decree and had less of the character of an alliance. Already in 1231, Frederick had issued the Constitutions of Melfi, a book of codified law and inquisitorial system applying to his Kingdom of Sicily. The Mainz Landfriede, now applicable indefinitely, was a constitutional act and became one of the basic laws that applied to the whole Empire. For the first time, this document was bilingually drafted in Latin and Middle High German.

Subsequently, numerous regional and local Landfrieden alliances such as city leagues (German: Städtebünde) arose during the 13th and 14th centuries. The 1235 Peace of Mainz was renewed at the diet of Würzburg in 1287 and again in 1290, 1298 and 1354. It was superseded by the Ewiger Landfriede "Perpetual Public Peace" passed by Maximilian I, Holy Roman Emperor in 1495, which outlawed any feuds and constituted a permanent Landfriede for the Holy Roman Empire, including the establishment of the Reichskammergericht "Imperial Chamber Court".

== Modern forms ==
Up to today a breach of the Landfrieden (Landfriedensbruch) by involvement in violent riots is a criminal offence according to German criminal law (§ 125 StGB) and the Austrian (§ 274 StGB) and Swiss (Art. 260 CH-StGB) equivalents. The preservation of the Landfrieden in the sense of public law and order – i.e. the ban on jungle law (Faustrecht) and frontier justice (Selbstjustiz) – by giving the state authorities a monopoly on violence, is the basis of all modern legal codes.

== See also ==
- Breach of the peace
- Landgericht (medieval)

== Literature ==
- Heinz Angermeier: Königtum und Landfriede im deutschen Spätmittelalter. Munich, 1966.
- Joachim Bumke: Höfische Kultur. Literatur und Gesellschaft im hohen Mittelalter (= dtv 30170). 11th edition. Deutscher Taschenbuch-Verlag, Munich, 2005, ISBN 3-423-30170-8.
- Arno Buschmann, Elmar Wadle (ed.): Landfrieden. Anspruch und Wirklichkeit (= Rechts- und staatswissenschaftliche Veröffentlichungen der Görres-Gesellschaft. NF Vol. 98). Schöningh, Paderborn etc., 2002, ISBN 3-506-73399-0.
- Mattias G. Fischer: Reichsreform und „Ewiger Landfrieden“. Über die Entwicklung des Fehderechts im 15. Jahrhundert bis zum absoluten Fehdeverbot von 1495 (= Untersuchungen zur deutschen Staats- und Rechtsgeschichte. NF Vol. 34). Scientia, Aalen, 2007, ISBN 978-3-511-02854-1 (Also: Göttingen, University, Dissertation, 2002).
- Joachim Gernhuber: Die Landfriedensbewegung in Deutschland bis zum Mainzer Reichslandfrieden von 1235 (= Bonner rechtswissenschaftliche Abhandlungen. H. 44, ZDB-ID 502603-9). Röhrscheid, Bonn, 1952.
- Duncan Hardy: Landfrieden. In: Irene Dingel, Michael Rohrschneider, Inken Schmidt-Voges, Siegrid Westphal and Joachim Whaley (eds.), Handbuch Frieden im Europa der Frühen Neuzeit / Handbook of Peace in Early Modern Europe. Berlin: De Gruyter, 2021, pp. 151–169. https://www.degruyter.com/document/doi/10.1515/9783110591316-008/html?lang=en
- Duncan Hardy: Between Regional Alliances and Imperial Assemblies: Landfrieden as a Political Concept and Discursive Strategy in the Holy Roman Empire, c. 1350-1520. In: Hendrik Baumbach and Horst Carl (eds.), Landfrieden – epochenübergreifend. Neue Perspektiven der Landfriedensforschung auf Verfassung, Recht, Konflikt (=Zeitschrift für Historische Forschung. Beihefte. 54.) Berlin: Duncker & Humblot, 2018, pp. 85–120.
- Guido Komatsu: Landfriedensbünde im 16. Jahrhundert. Ein typologischer Vergleich. Dissertation, University of Göttingen, 2001 (Volltext).
- Elmar Wadle: Landfrieden, Strafe, Recht. Zwölf Studien zum Mittelalter (= Schriften zur europäischen Rechts- und Verfassungsgeschichte. Vol. 37). Duncker & Humblot, Berlin, 2001, ISBN 3-428-09912-5.
