= Abdias of Babylon =

First bishop of Babylon and one of the Seventy Apostles

Patriarch of Babylon
- Born: c. 1st century AD
- Died: c. 2nd century AD
- Canonized: Pre-Congregation
- Feast: 28 October

Legend makes Abdias (or Obadiah) first bishop of Babylon and one of the Seventy Apostles who are collectively mentioned in the Gospel of Luke 10:1–20. Saints Simon and Jude allegedly consecrated him as the first Bishop of Babylon. He is also associated with St. Thomas and St. Addai, recognized as the first Patriarch of the Church of the East in Syriac Christianity.

== History of the Apostolical Contest ==
An apocryphal work in ten books called Historia Certaminis Apostolici ("History of the Apostolical Contest") was traditionally ascribed to an Abdias, assumed to be this bishop of Babylon. It is a major collection of New Testament apocrypha, which tells of the labors and miracles, persecution and deaths of the Apostles. It exhibits a taste for the marvelous that places the narratives in the genre of heroic romances, of which "these stories came at length to form a sort of apostolic cycle"

This compilation purports to have been translated from Hebrew into Greek by "Eutropius", a disciple of Abdias, and, in the third century, from Greek into Latin by Sextus Julius Africanus, the friend of Origen, or as reported in Golden Legend by his disciple Tropaeus Africanus.

Later scholarship determined the book was originally written in Latin, probably around 910 AD, long after the death of Abdias of Babylon. The most obvious clues include the book's citations of the Vulgate of St Jerome, of the Ecclesiastical History of Rufinus and of his Latin translation of the Recognitiones of Clement.

An earlier date of composition is given by R. A. Lipsius, who theorizes the work was compiled during the latter half of the sixth century, in an unidentified Frankish monastery, for the purpose of satisfying the natural curiosity of Western Christians. At the same time the author of this Historia used much older pseudo-Apostolic materials that he abridged or excerpted to suit his purpose. He often revised or expurgated to conform them to Catholic teaching, because many of the writings that he used were originally Gnostic compositions, filled with Gnostic speeches and prayers.

The work is of interest because of what the author claims to have drawn from the ancient Acta of the Apostles, and because of many ancient legends which have survived in this collection. The text of the compiler who may then be called the Pseudo-Abdias may be found in Constantin von Tischendorf, and in the Codex Apocryphus Novi Testimenti of Johann Albert Fabricius. There are also parallel texts of single books printed in the Bollandists' Acta Sanctorum.
