= Baldwin of Ninove =

Flemish historian

Baudouin of Ninove was a Flemish historian active around 1294. His Chronicon runs from the birth of Christ to that year.
