= Pseudo-Abdias =

New Testament apocryphal texts

The Apostolic Histories (Latin: Historia Apostolica), also known as Pseudo-Abdias, is a collection of New Testament apocrypha in the genre of apostolic Acts popular in medieval Europe and preserved in Latin translations. It consists of ten books, each containing several chapters. Each book describes the life of one of the Apostles.

The attribution of the collection to "Pseudo-Abdias" is dubious. Swiss scholar Wolfgang Lazius attributed the full collection on the basis of an epilogue to one of the books mentioning "Abdias, Bishop of Babylon" in a 1552 edition. Abdias was presented as a companion of the apostles Simon and Judas Thaddeus on their way to Persia in the Passion of Simon and Jude (BHL H, 7749-7751). As the various stories circulated independently of each other, extending Pseudo-Abdias's authorship to all ten books is not considered likely by contemporary scholars, nor is it even clear that the Passion was claiming to be written by him if the epilogue is ignored.

== History ==
In Lazius' editio princeps (W. Lazius, Abdiae Babyloniae episcopi et apostolorum discipuli de historia certaminis apostolici libri decem Basel, 1552), the introduction to the Pseudo-Abdias is allegedly written by Sextus Julius Africanus who claimed the originals were written by Abdias of Babylon who was allegedly consecrated by Saint Simon and personally knew some of the Apostles. Abdias was supposed to have originally written them in Hebrew and Latin, after which they were translated into Ancient Greek by "Eutropius", his assistant.

The claims to the documents being genuine works of Abdias have been widely disputed for several centuries. Their original authorship was first brought into question over book six, which was associated with another assistant of Abdias called "Caton". Book six covers the lives of Saint Simon and Saint Jude. It has also been noted that a similar volume called the Pseudo-Crato was allegedly written by a disciple of Simon's called Crato.

Pseudo-Abdias was published in 1703 by Johann Albert Fabricius in the second volume of a collection he had compiled of apocryphal manuscripts. He subtitled it "Acta Apostolorum Apocrypha, sive, Historia Certaminis Apostolici adscripta Abdiae" (English: The Apocryphal Acts of the Apostles, or, the History of the Apostolic Struggle ascribed to Abdias).

The art historian Otto Demus argued that Pseudo-Abdias was a significant influence upon the designers of the mosaics of St Mark's Basilica in Venice. Meredith Parsons Lilich sees the same influence of Pseudo-Abdias in the stained glass of Reims Cathedral.
