= Annales breves Wormatienses =

Annales breves Wormatienses ('Short Annals of Worms', German: Kurze Jahrbücher von Worms) is the conventional title for a set of anonymous Latin annals known from a single manuscript found in the monastery of Kirschgarten in Worms. They cover the years 1165–1295 and, to judge by their focus, were probably written in the archdiocese of Mainz and not in Worms. The manuscript, copied at Kirschgarten between 1496 and 1510, is now in Copenhagen, Arnamagnæan Manuscript Collection, AM 830 4°, where the Annales are found on folios 134^{r}–139^{v}. It was edited by G. H. Pertz for the Monumenta Germaniae Historica series.

In the manuscript, the annals are introduced by a rubric that reads Qvae contigerunt temporibus Frederici primi imperatoris ejusqve sequacium ('what happened in the time of Frederick the first emperor and his successors'). The annalist makes frequent errors of dating, which Pertz corrected in the margins of his edition. For example, the first entry bears the date 1170, but it describes events that took place in 1165. The entry on the anti-Mongol crusade of 1241 reads:

1238. [sic] Tartari de locis suis cum infinita multitudine exeuntes, Hungariam Poloniam Moraviam et terras adiacentes in maxima parte destruxerunt, contra quos principes de Merseburg cruce signantur.

The Tatars, [leaving their places with an infinite multitude, and] against whom the princes at Merseberg are signed with the cross, destroyed the greater part of Hungary, Poland, Moravia and adjacent lands.
