= Albert von Behaim =

Czech priest

Albert von Behaim or Albertus Bohemus (ca. 1180 – 1260) was a papal legate and supporter of papal rights against the Holy Roman Emperor Frederick II.

== Life ==
Likely born at Boheiming or Böhaming, in the Diocese of Passau, he died at Passau. He was partisan of the popes in their struggle with Frederick II. In 1205, he went to Rome, where he was employed at the papal court as an expert in law. In 1237, he returned to Germany, and through his efforts a league was formed against Frederick II between Otto of Bavaria, Wenceslaus of Bohemia, and Frederick of Austria. When excommunication was pronounced against the emperor in 1239, Behaim was made a permanent delegate and commissioned to make the sentence effective. For that purpose he appealed to the bishops of Germany (1240), and when they proved themselves negligent he excommunicated a number of ecclesiastics and laymen of prominence. At the same time, he worked for the election of a new king. However, his excessive severity had no effect, and he was forced to leave the country. In 1245, he was at the Council of Lyon, where Frederick was again excommunicated, and he worked as before against the emperor.

His office of papal delegate came to an end in 1253. From that time he lived in Passau, where he had been dean of the chapter since 1246. He laboured with zeal, but not without many conflicts, until his death.

== Works ==
He left two diaries, known as the first and second Missivbuch. Fragments of the first were edited by Andreas Felix von Oefele, in "Rerum Boicarum Scriptores", vol. 1; the second by Konstantin von Höfler in "Bibliothek des litterarischen Vereins" (Stuttgart, 1847).

Attribution
