= Onychomancy =

Form of divination using fingernails

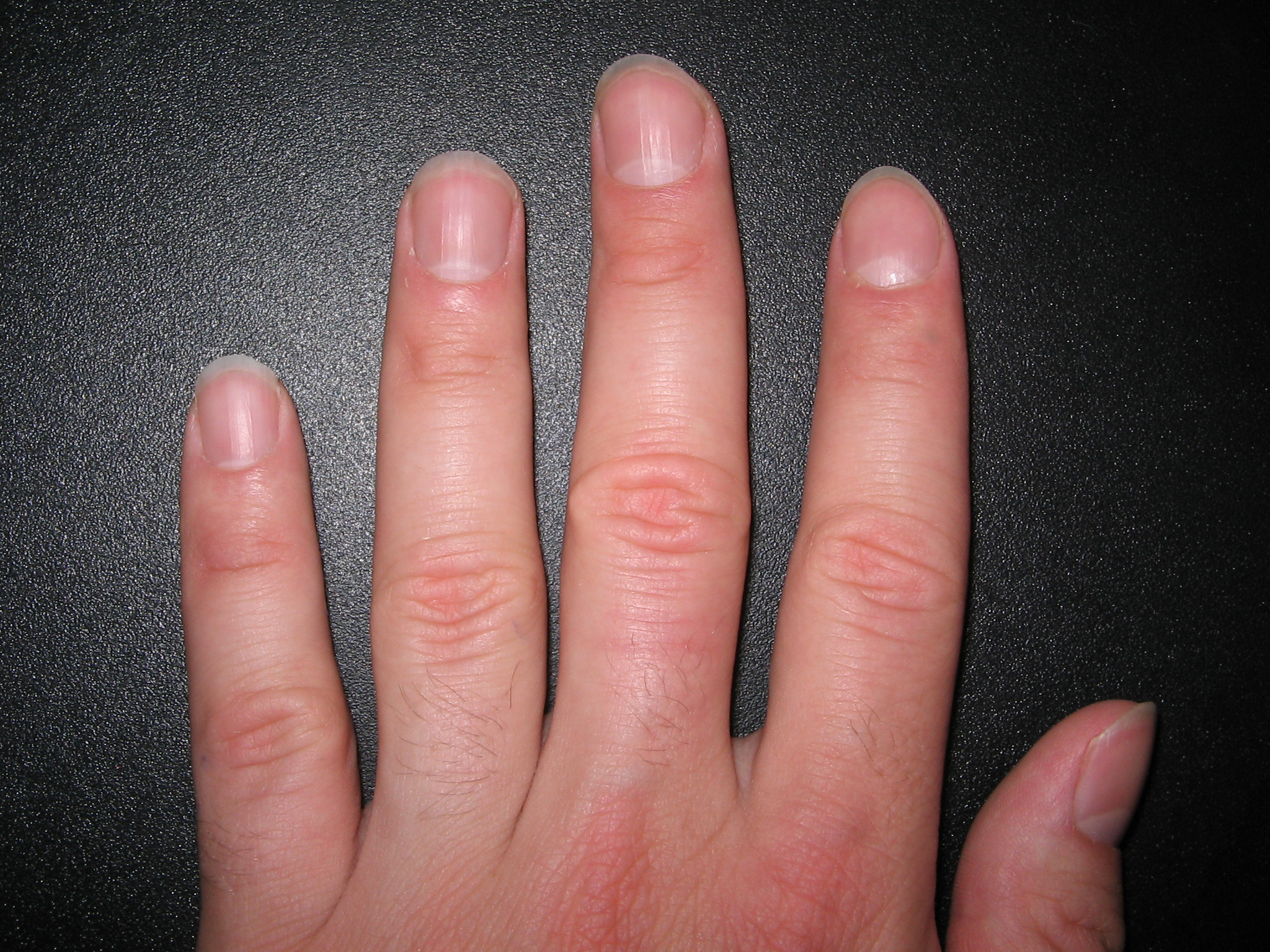
Onychomancy: fingernails analysis

Onychomancy or onymancy (from Greek onychos, 'fingernail', and manteia, 'fortune-telling') is an ancient form of divination using fingernails as a "crystal ball" or "scrying mirror" and is considered a subdivision of palmistry (also called chiromancy). As with palmistry, the contradictions between different interpretations and the lack of evidence for the predictions have led onychomancy to be viewed as a pseudoscience by academics.

It consists of gazing in bright sunlight at one's own fingernails or another person's fingernails that often are coated in oil and then interpreting the "symbols" that appear on them. In medieval times onychomancy was performed by gazing at the fingernails of a prepubescent (unspoiled) boy.

The symbols are interpreted in relation to chakra points, reflexology points, astrological planetary interpretations or tarot card representations. The fingers on which symbols appear and the position of the symbols on the fingernails are interpreted as indications of health conditions, changes in fortune and wealth, the character of the person being "read" and other typical subjects covered by divinations.

A separate subdivision of onychomancy interprets personalities based on the artificial nails the person has chosen to wear.

== Interpretation ==
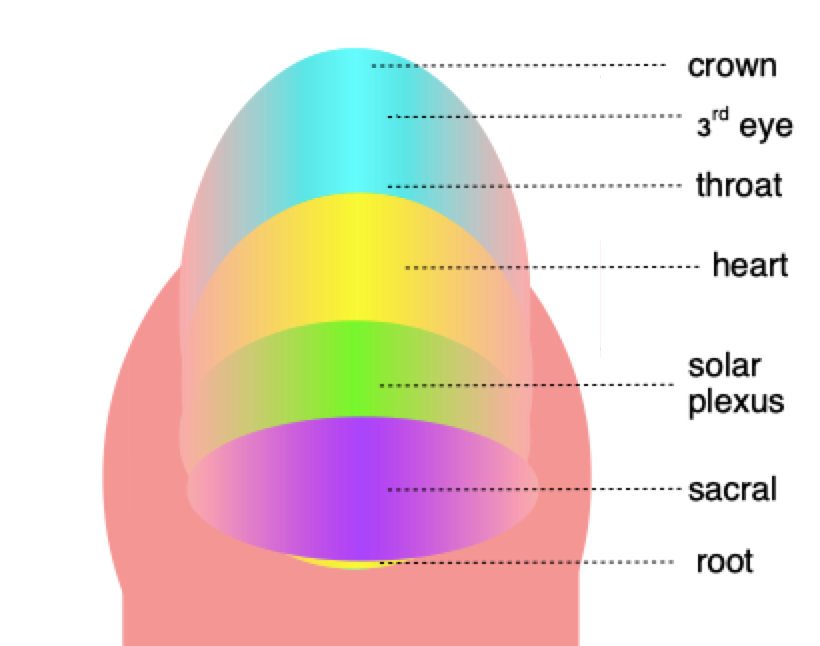
Onychomancy fingernail chart showing alleged correspondence with chakra points.

Practitioners of onychomancy relate patterns observed on the fingernails with chakras, reflexology points, astrological interpretations of planets and Tarot. Furthermore, stimulation of the fingers by rubbing or massage is believed to have beneficial effects on the related body part(s).

Chakras: The hands are supposed to represent the central chakra points. For example, the base of the nail corresponds to the root chakra. This point also corresponds with the reproductive organs in the reflexology systems, hence massage of the base of the nail is believed to stimulate the reproductive organs. It is also believed that the longer the nails are the larger the crown and 3rd eye chakra regions are and hence the more intuitive and receptive the person. "Growing your nails out is like getting a bigger satellite dish for better reception. They literally pick up on the vibrations around you."

Astrology: Each finger is "ruled by one of the planets" in the astrological system; the thumb is Mars (and the head), the index finger is Jupiter (expansion of consciousness, philosophy), the middle finger is Saturn (restriction of consciousness, discipline), the ring finger is Apollo (pleasure and creativity), the small finger is Mercury (communication, exchange of ideas).

Reflexology: Massage of any of the fingers is believed to stimulate the sinuses, while the thumb also relieves headaches, the index finger is believed to stimulate the hair, and the small finger is believed to stimulate the ears.

Tarot: Each of the ten fingers is assigned a card from the Major Arcana, and each pair of fingers (right and left thumbs, right and left index fingers, etc.) are assigned another tarot card. Broken nails are interpreted as reversed cards. The appearance of a pattern on a finger would be equivalent to that card being drawn in a tarot card reading session.

A subdivision of onychomancy, called Kikimancy, relates the shape of the nails to the classical elements (earth, air, fire and water), Yin and yang and personality types. Kikimancy considers not only the natural nail but also the choice of artificial nail as indicator of personality traits.

== See also ==
- Phrenology
- Physiognomy
- Metoposcopy
- Mien Shiang
