= Cheiro =

Irish astrologer, palmist, and numerologist

William John Warner
- Born: 1 November 1866; Dublin, Ireland
- Died: 8 October 1936 (aged 69); Hollywood, California
- Occupations: Astrologer; numerologist; palmist; author
- Spouse: Katherine Florence Mena Bilsborough (m. 1929; died 1936)
- Writing career
- Pen name: Cheiro

William John Warner (also self-identified as Count Louis le Warner de Hamon), popularly known as Cheiro (1 November 1866 – 8 October 1936), was an Irish astrologer and colourful occult figure of the early 20th century. His sobriquet, Cheiro, derives from the word cheiromancy, meaning palmistry. He was a self-described clairvoyant who said he learned palmistry, astrology, and Chaldean numerology in India. He was celebrated for using these forms of divination to make personal predictions for famous clients and to foresee world events.

== Personal life and background ==
The son of William Warner and Margaret Thompson Warner, Cheiro was born William John Warner in the barony of Rathdown, outside Dublin, Ireland. He took the name Count Louis Hamon (or Count Leigh de Hamong).

As mentioned in his memoirs, Cheiro acquired his expertise in India. As a teenager, he travelled to the Bombay port of Apollo Bunder. There, he wrote that he met his guru, an Indian Chitpavan Brahmin, who took him to his village in the valley of the Konkan region of Maharashtra. Later Cheiro was permitted by Brahmans to study an ancient book that has many studies on hands. After studying thoroughly for two years, he returned to London and started his career as a palmist.

In 1920 he married Mrs. Katie Hartland.

== Career ==
Cheiro had a wide following of famous European and American clients during the late 19th and early 20th centuries. He read palms and told the fortunes of famous celebrities like Mark Twain, W. T. Stead, Sarah Bernhardt, Mata Hari, Oscar Wilde, Grover Cleveland, Thomas Edison, the Prince of Wales, General Kitchener, William Ewart Gladstone, and Joseph Chamberlain. He documented his sittings with these clients by asking them to sign a guest book he kept for the purpose, in which he encouraged them to comment on their experiences as subjects of his character analyses and predictions. Of the Prince of Wales, he wrote that "I would not be surprised if he did not give up everything, including his right to be crowned, for the woman he loved." Cheiro also predicted that the Jews would return to Palestine and the country would again be called Israel.

In his own autobiographical book, Cheiro's Memoirs: The Reminiscences of a Society Palmist, he included accounts of his interviews with King Edward VII, William Gladstone, Charles Stewart Parnell, Henry Morton Stanley, Sarah Bernhardt, Oscar Wilde, Professor Max Muller, Blanche Roosevelt, the Comte de Paris, Joseph Chamberlain, Lord Russell of Killowen, Robert Ingersoll, Ella Wheeler Wilcox, Lillie Langtry, W. T. Stead, Richard Croker, Natalia Janotha, and other prominent people of his era.

The book Titanic's Last Secrets includes a detailed account of one of Cheiro's palm readings with William Pirrie, chairman of Harland and Wolf, builders of the Titanic. Cheiro predicted that he would soon be in a fight for his life, talking about the battle surrounding the Titanic sinking.

It becomes a study not contrary to the dictates of reason, but in accordance with those natural laws that we observe in the shaping of the even inanimate objects, which, by demonstrating the effect of a heretofore cause, are in themselves the cause of a hereafter effect. – Cheiro

So popular was Cheiro as a "society palmist" that even those who were not believers in the occult had their hands read by him. The skeptical Mark Twain wrote in Cheiro's visitor's book:

Cheiro has exposed my character to me with humiliating accuracy. I ought not to confess this accuracy, still I am moved to do so. – Mark Twain

Other mentions in the visitors book include:

"The study of people gifted with occult powers has interested me for several years. I have met and consulted scores. In almost ever respect I consider Cheiro the most highly gifted of all. He helps as well as astonishes." - Ella Wheeler Wilcox.

"You are wonderful. What more can I say" - Madame Nellie Melba.

== Death ==
Cheiro died in Hollywood on October 19, 1936, after having been ill a good amount of time. Time magazine noted that he had accumulated a quarter of a million dollars from his clientele of wealthy women, among other accomplishments.

== Bibliography ==
The occult books Cheiro wrote centred on fortune telling. Many of Cheiro's books on occultism and fortune telling are still in print today and are available in both English and foreign language editions.

In 2006, the University of Tampa Press issued a critical new edition of his fictional work, A Study of Destiny, as the second volume of the series Insistent Visions – a series dedicated to reprinting little-known or neglected works of supernatural fiction, science fiction, mysteries, or adventure stories from the 19th century. The new edition is edited with an introduction, afterword, and notes by Sean Donnelly.

=== Numerology ===
- Cheiro's Book of Numbers ISBN 978-1940849300

=== Palmistry ===
- Cheiro's Language of the Hand (first self-published in 1894)
- Cheiro's Guide to the Hand
- You and Your Hand
- Palmistry for All (1916)
- The Cheiro Book of Fate and Fortune
- Cheiro's Complete Palmistry

=== Astrology ===
- When were you Born?
- Cheiro's You and Your Star: The Book of the Zodiac
- Cheiro's Book of World Predictions
- Cheiro's Memoirs: Reminiscences of a Society Palmist
- Titanic's Last Secrets
- True Ghost Stories (attested tales of paranormal experiences)

=== Fiction ===
- A Study of Destiny (also published as The Hand of Fate, first released in 1898)

=== Magazine appearances ===
- "A Bargain with a Spirit" (true story), Ghost Stories, October 1929
- "The Haunting Horror of the White Bat" (true story), Ghost Stories, November 1929
- "Nurse Cavell Speaks" (true story), Ghost Stories, December 1929
- "The Fatal Mummy Case" (true story), Ghost Stories, March 1930
- "A Chinese Web of Mystery" (true story), Ghost Stories, May 1931
- "The Fatal Mummy Case" (true story), Ghost Stories, March 1930
- "The Tsar and Rasputin," Cassell's Magazine, September 1931
- "Cheiro and Two Kings," Cassell's Magazine, October 1931
- "Fateful Forecasts," Cassell's Magazine, November 1931
- "Secrets of Monte Carlo," Cassell's Magazine, December 1931
