= Physiognomy =

Pseudoscience of face reading

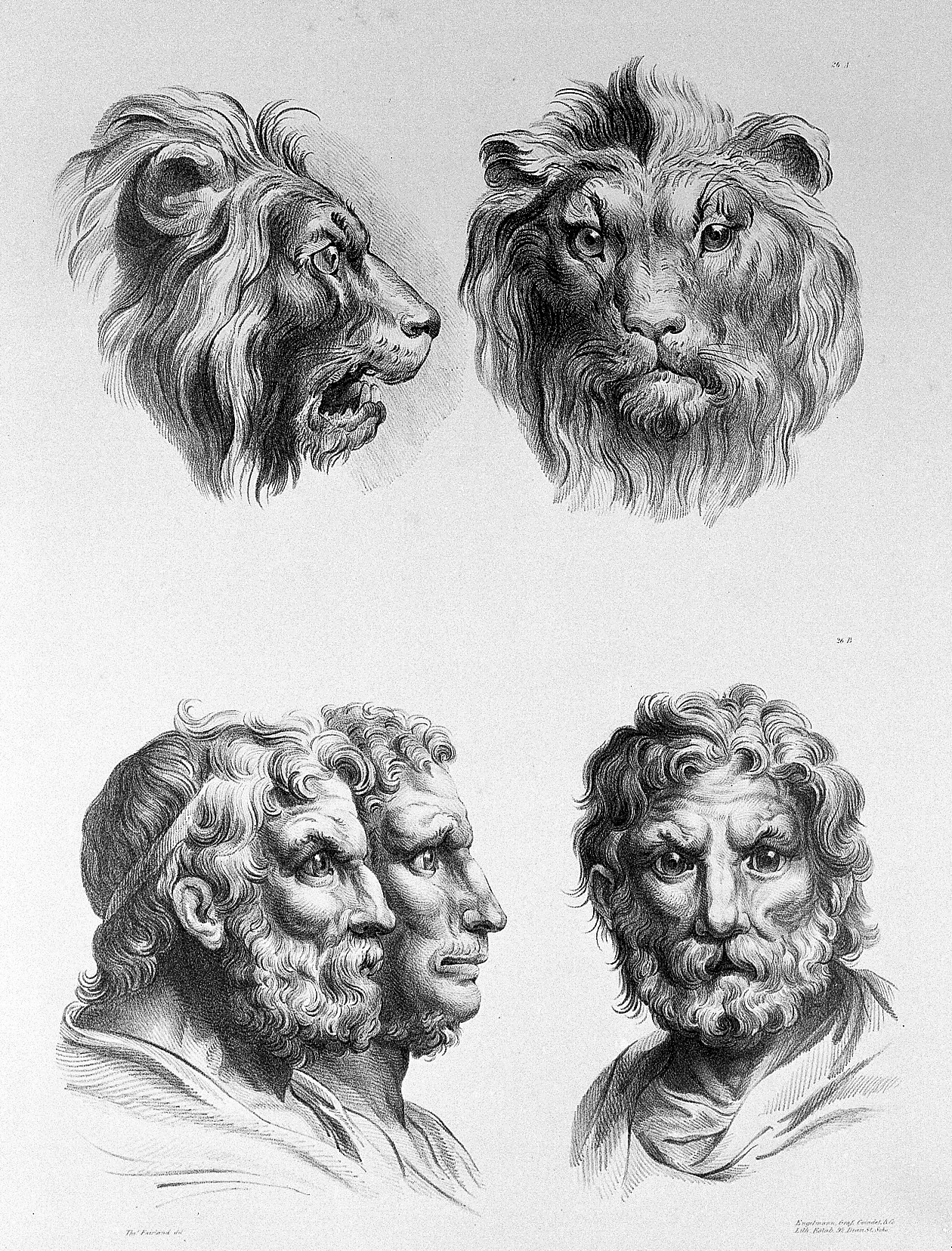
Lithographic drawing illustrative of the relation between the human physiognomy and that of the brute creation, by Charles Le Brun (1619–1690)

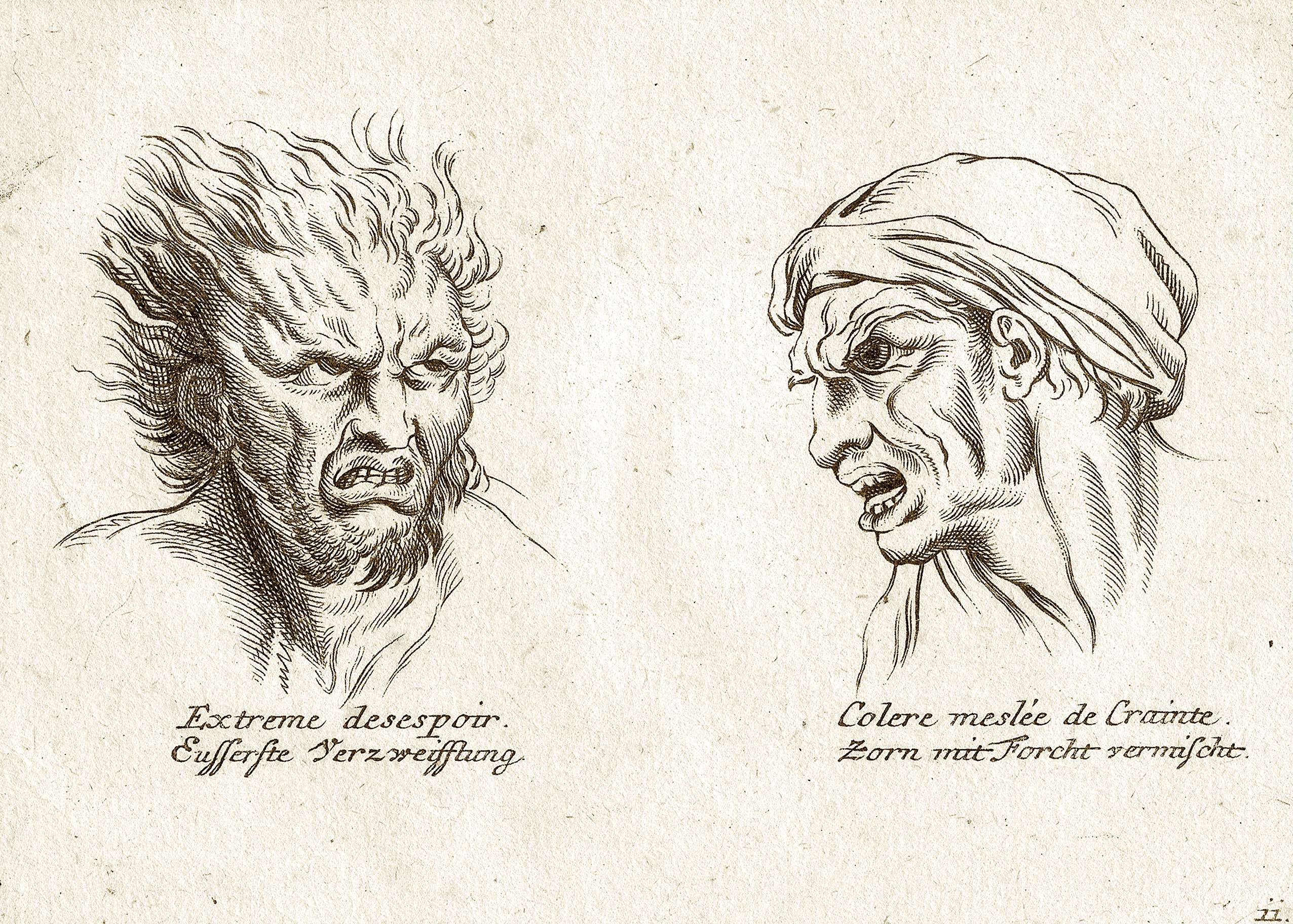
Illustration in a 19th-century book about physiognomy

Physiognomy, (Note: UK: /ˌfɪziˈɒnəmi/ FIZ-ee-ON-ə-mee, US: /ˌfɪziˈɒɡnəmi/ FIZ-ee-OG-nə-mee; from Greek φύσις (phýsis) 'nature' + γνώμων (gnṓmōn) 'judge, interpreter'.) or face reading and sometimes known by the later term anthroposcopy, (Note: /ˌænθrəˈpɒskəpi/ AN-thrə-POSK-ə-pee; from Greek ἄνθρωπος (ánthrōpos) 'person' + σκοπός (skopós) 'watcher, looker'.) is the practice of assessing a person's character or personality from their outer appearance—especially the face. The term physiognomy can also refer to the general appearance of a person, object, or terrain without reference to its implied characteristics—as in the physiognomy of an individual plant (e.g. plant life-form) or of a plant community (e.g. vegetation).

Physiognomy as a practice meets the contemporary definition of pseudoscience, and is regarded as such by academics because of its unsupported claims; popular belief in the practice of physiognomy is nonetheless still widespread. The practice was well-accepted by ancient Greek philosophers, but fell into disrepute in the 16th century while practised by vagabonds and mountebanks. It revived and was popularised by Johann Kaspar Lavater, before falling from favour in the late 19th century.

Physiognomy in the 19th century is particularly noted as a basis for scientific racism. Physiognomy as it is understood today is a subject of renewed scientific interest, especially as it relates to machine learning and facial recognition technology. The main interest for scientists today are the risks, including privacy concerns, of physiognomy in the context of facial recognition algorithms.

== Ancient ==
Notions of the relationship between an individual's outward appearance and inner character date back to antiquity, and occasionally appear in early Greek poetry. Siddhars from ancient India defined Samudrika Shastra as identifying personal characteristics with body features. Chinese physiognomy or Chinese face reading (mianxiang) dates back to at least the Spring and Autumn period.

Early indications of a developed physiognomic theory appear in 5th century BC Athens, with the works of Zopyrus (featured in dialogue by Phaedo of Elis), an expert in the art. By the 4th century BC, the philosopher Aristotle frequently referred to theory and literature concerning the relationship of appearance to character. Aristotle was receptive to such an idea, evidenced by a passage in his Prior Analytics:

It is possible to infer character from features, if it is granted the body and the soul are changed together by the natural affections: I say "natural", for although perhaps by learning music, a man made some change in his soul, this is not one of those affections natural to us; rather I refer to passions and desires when I speak of natural emotions. If then this were granted and also for each change, there is a corresponding sign, and we could state the affection and sign proper to each kind of animal, we shall be able to infer character from features.

— Prior Analytics 2.27 (Trans. A. J. Jenkinson)

The first systematic physiognomic treatise is a slim volume, Physiognomonica (Physiognomonics), ascribed to Aristotle, but probably of his "school", rather than created by Aristotle himself. The volume is divided into two parts, conjectured as originally two separate works. The first section discusses arguments drawn from nature and describes other races (non-Greek) and concentrates on the concept of human behavior. The second section focuses on animal behavior, dividing the animal kingdom into male and female types. From these are deduced correspondences between human form and character.

After Aristotle, the major extant works in physiognomy are:

- Polemo of Laodicea, de Physiognomonia (2nd century AD), in Greek
- Adamantius the Sophist, Physiognomonica (4th century), in Greek
- An anonymous Latin author, de Physiognomonia (about 4th century)

Ancient Greek mathematician, astronomer, and scientist Pythagoras—who some believe originated physiognomics—once rejected a prospective follower named Cylon because, to Pythagoras, his appearance indicated bad character. After inspecting Socrates, a physiognomist announced he was given to intemperance, sensuality, and violent bursts of passion—which was so contrary to Socrates's image, his students accused the physiognomist of lying. Socrates put the issue to rest by saying, originally, he was given to all these vices, but had particularly strong self-discipline.

== Middle Ages and Renaissance ==
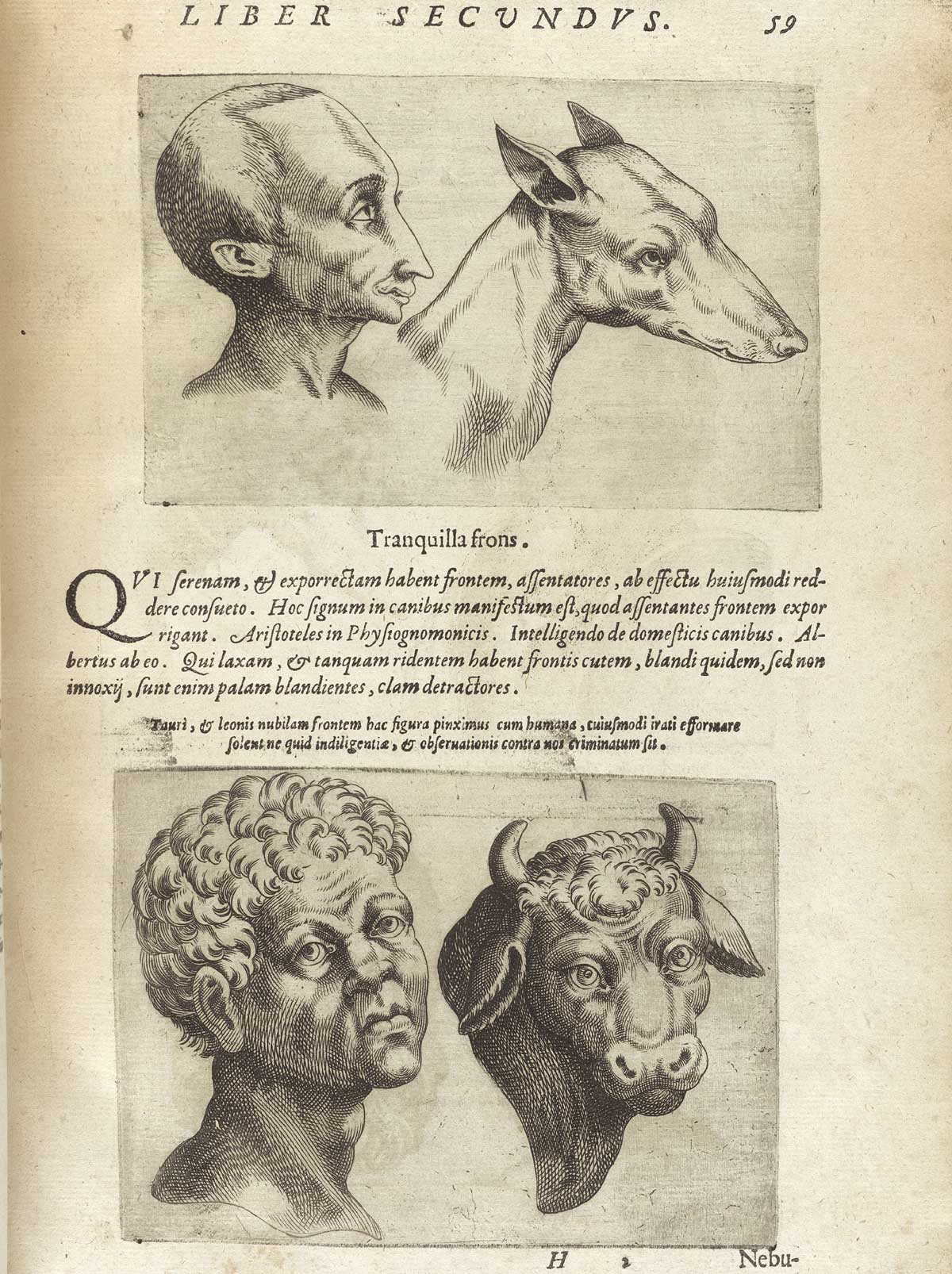
Giambattista Della Porta, De humana physiognomonia (Vico Equense [Naples]: Apud Iosephum Cacchium, 1586

During the Islamic Golden Age, the 12th-century Persian theologian and philosopher Fakhr al-Din al-Razi discussed physiognomy in his work Kitab al-Firasa (Book on Firasa), exploring the link between physical features and moral qualities. His contributions represent an early integration of physiognomic ideas within Arab thought. The term 'physiognomy' was common in Middle English, often written as 'fisnamy' or 'visnomy', as in the Tale of Beryn, a spurious addition to The Canterbury Tales: "I knowe wele by thy fisnamy, thy kynd it were to stele".

Physiognomy's validity was once widely accepted. Michael Scot, a court scholar for Frederick II, Holy Roman Emperor, wrote Liber physiognomiae in the early 13th century concerning the subject. English universities taught physiognomy until Henry VIII of England outlawed "beggars and vagabonds playing 'subtile, crafty and unlawful games such as physnomye or 'palmestrye'" in 1530 or 1531. Around this time, scholastic leaders settled on the more erudite Greek form 'physiognomy' and began to discourage the entire concept of 'fisnamy'.

Leonardo da Vinci dismissed physiognomy in the early 16th century as "false", a chimera with "no scientific foundation". Nevertheless, da Vinci believed that facial lines caused by facial expressions could indicate personality traits. For example, he wrote that "those who have deep and noticeable lines between the eyebrows are irascible".

== Modern ==
=== Johann Kaspar Lavater ===
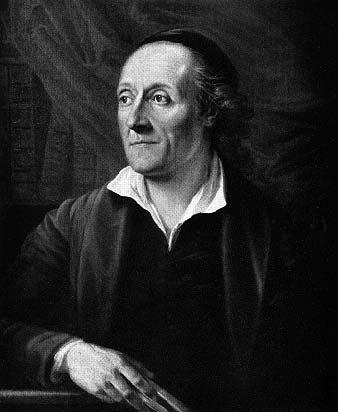
Johann Kaspar Lavater

The principal promoter of physiognomy in modern times, the Swiss poet and pastor Johann Kaspar Lavater (1741–1801), was briefly a friend of Goethe. Lavater's essays on physiognomy, first published in German in 1772, gained great popularity. These influential essays were translated into French and English, and influenced early criminological theory.

=== Lavater's critics ===
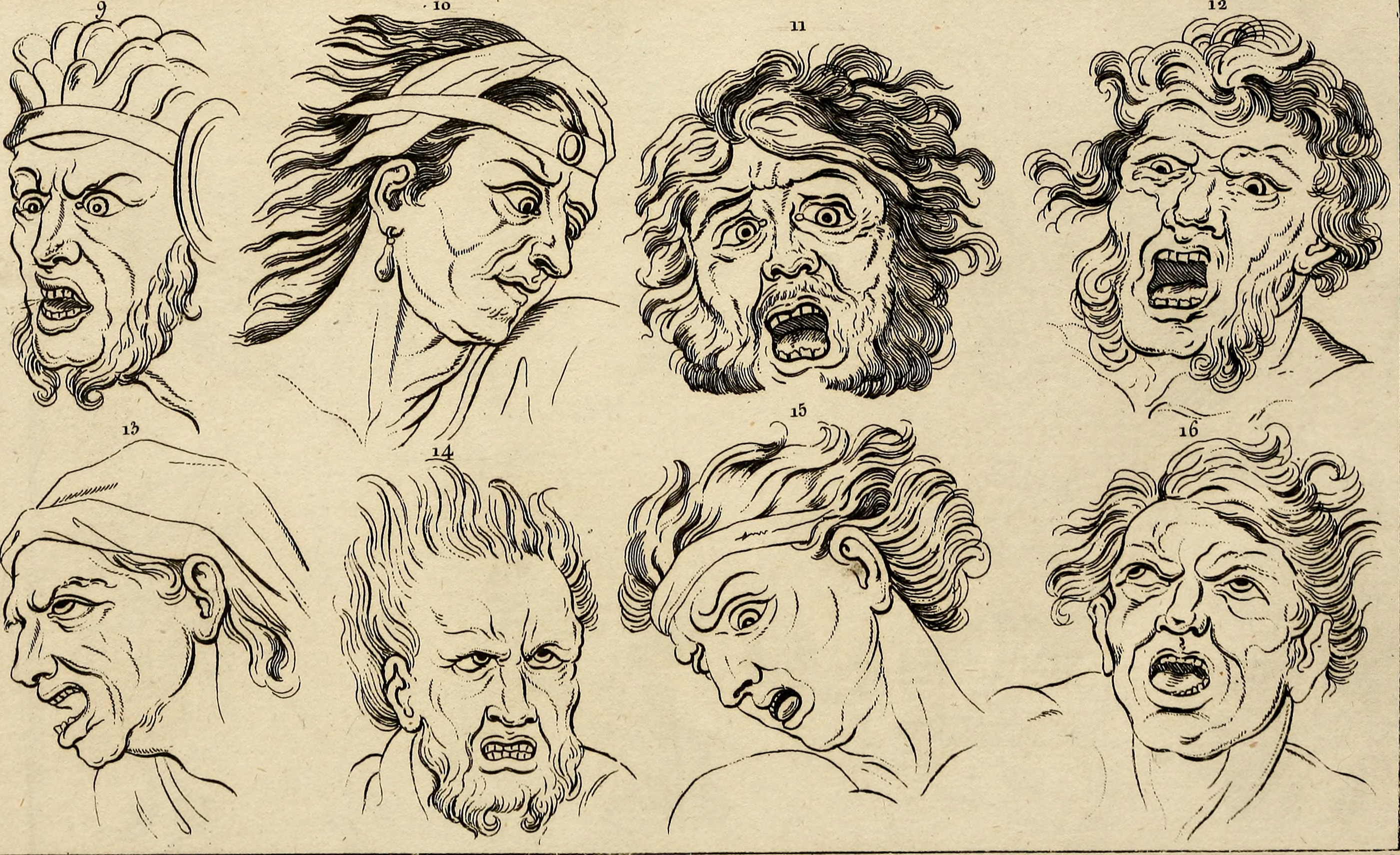
A page from Lavater's "Essays on physiognomy; calculated to extend the knowledge and the love of mankind (1797)"

Lavater received mixed reactions from scientists, with some accepting his research and others criticizing it. His harshest critic was scientist Georg Christoph Lichtenberg, who said pathognomy, or discovering the character of a person by observing their behavior, was more effective. English religious writer Hannah More (1745–1833) complained to her contemporary writer Horace Walpole, "In vain do we boast ... that philosophy had broken down all the strongholds of prejudice, ignorance, and superstition; and yet, at this very time ... Lavater's physiognomy books sell at fifteen guineas a set."

=== Thomas Browne ===
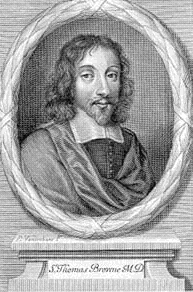
Sir Thomas Browne

Lavater found confirmation of his ideas from the English physician-philosopher Sir Thomas Browne (1605–1682), and the Italian Giambattista Della Porta (1535–1615). Browne in his Religio Medici (1643) discusses the possibility of the discernment of inner qualities from the outer appearance of the face, and wrote:

there is surely a Physiognomy, which those experienced and Master Mendicants observe. ... For there are mystically in our faces certain Characters that carry in them the motto of our Souls, wherein he that cannot read A.B.C. may read our natures.

— Religio Medici, part 2:2

Browne reaffirmed his physiognomic beliefs in Christian Morals (circa 1675):

Since the Brow speaks often true, since Eyes and Noses have Tongues, and the countenance proclaims the heart and inclinations; let observation so far instruct thee in Physiognomical lines ... we often observe that Men do most act those Creatures, whose constitution, parts, and complexion do most predominate in their mixtures. This is a corner-stone in Physiognomy ... there are therefore Provincial Faces, National Lips and Noses, which testify not only the Natures of those Countries, but of those which have them elsewhere.

— Part 2 section 9

Browne also introduced the word caricature into the English language, whence much of physiognomical belief attempted to entrench itself by illustrative means, in particular through visual political satire. Italian scholar Giambattista della Porta's works are well represented in the Library of Sir Thomas Browne including Of Celestial Physiognomy, in which della Porta argued that it was not the stars but a person's temperament that influences their facial appearance and character. In De humana physiognomia (1586), della Porta used woodcuts of animals to illustrate human characteristics. Both della Porta and Browne adhered to the 'doctrine of signatures'—that is, the belief that the physical structures of nature such as a plant's roots, stem, and flower, were indicative keys (or 'signatures') to their medicinal potentials.

== Period of popularity ==
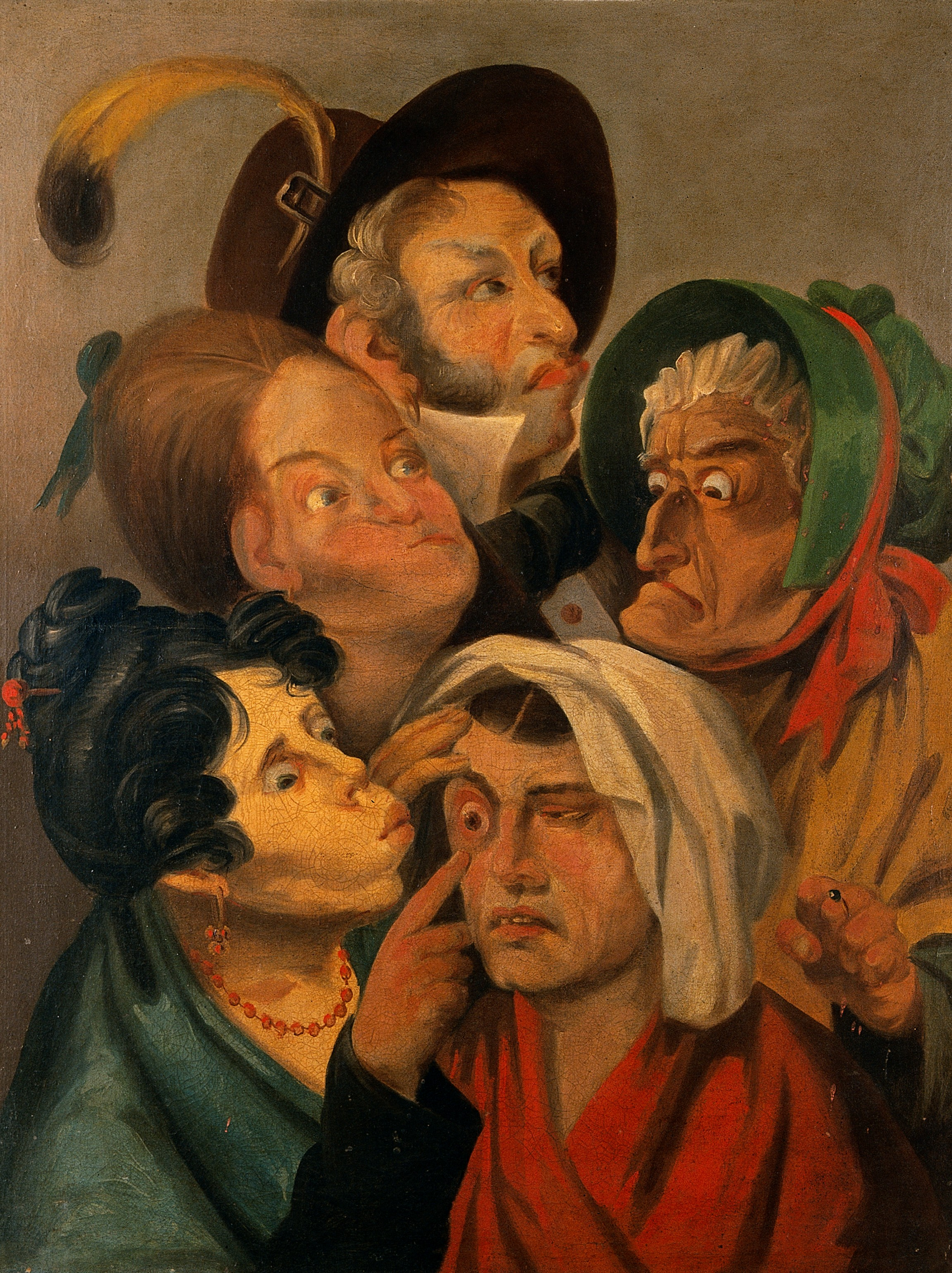
A bizarre physiognomical caricature with a figure blowing into the eye of the other. Oil painting by a follower of Louis-Léopold Boilly.

The popularity of physiognomy grew throughout the first quarter of the 18th century and into the 19th century. It was discussed seriously by academics, who believed in its potential.

=== Use in fiction and art ===
Many European novelists used physiognomy in the descriptions of their characters, notably Balzac, Chaucer and portrait artists, such as Joseph Ducreux. A host of 19th-century English authors were influenced by the idea, notably evident in the detailed physiognomic descriptions of characters in the novels of Charles Dickens, Thomas Hardy, and Charlotte Brontë. Descriptions over one's appearance in the written form was a way for one to gauge the character's intelligence, ability, morals, and social status. While it did provide some benefits like more accurate and detailed written descriptions of appearance, it also had a negative effect on gender, class, and race due to increased stereotyping and manipulation.

In addition to Thomas Browne, other literary authors associated with Norwich who made physiognomical observations in their writings include the romantic novelist Amelia Opie, and the travelogue author George Borrow. Physiognomy is a central, implicit assumption underlying the plot of Oscar Wilde's The Picture of Dorian Gray. In 19th-century American literature, physiognomy figures prominently in the short stories of Edgar Allan Poe.

=== Phrenology ===
Phrenology, a pseudoscience that measures the bumps on the skull in order to determine mental and personality characteristics, was created around 1800 by German physician Franz Joseph Gall and Johann Spurzheim, and was widely popular in the 19th century in Europe and the United States. In the U.S., physician James W. Redfield published his Comparative Physiognomy in 1852, illustrating with 330 engravings the "Resemblances between Men and Animals". He finds these in appearance and (often metaphorically) character, e.g. Germans to Lions, Negroes to Elephants and Fishes, Chinamen to Hogs, Yankees to Bears, Jews to Goats. While phrenology and physiognomy are separate from each other, they were so closely connected during the early nineteenth century that the terms were often used in place of each other.

A prominent 19th century physiognomist, Samuel Wells, published New Physiognomy, or, Signs of Character in 1867 as a way to explain the principles of physiognomy and phrenology, as well as showing the connection between the two concepts. Wells included four principles to introduced readers to the subject:

1. The brain is the special organ of the mind. The essence and mode of operation of the mind itself are inscrutable; we can only study its manifestations.
2. The mind, though essentially a unit, is made up of about forty different faculties, each of which is manifested by means of a particular part of the brain, set apart exclusively for it and called its organ ... .
3. When other conditions are the same, the larger the brain the stronger it is; and the larger portion of the brain occupied for the manifestation of a faculty, the stronger its manifestation.
4. Those portions of the brain used for faculties related to each other are located together. Thus the brain is divided into regions or groups, as well into organs. The location and boundaries of these organs and regions may be best learned from the Phrenological bust, and the accompanying diagram ... .

In the late 19th century phrenology began to be taken less seriously which lead to physiognomy being regarded as a pseudoscience because of the close connection between the two. Nevertheless, the German physiognomist Carl Huter (1861–1912) became popular in Germany with his concept of physiognomy, called "psycho-physiognomy".

=== Criminology ===
During the late 19th century, English psychometrician Sir Francis Galton attempted to define physiognomic characteristics of health, disease, beauty, and criminality, via a method of composite photography. Galton's process involved the photographic superimposition of two or more faces by multiple exposures. After averaging together photographs of violent criminals, he found that the composite image appeared "more respectable" than any of the faces comprising it; this was likely due to the irregularities of the skin across the constituent images being averaged out in the final blend. With the advent of computer technology during the early 1990s, Galton's composite technique has been adopted and greatly improved using computer graphics software.

Physiognomy also became of use in the field of Criminology through efforts made by Italian army doctor and scientist, Cesare Lombroso. Lombroso, during the mid-19th century, championed the notion that "criminality was inherited and that criminals could be identified by physical attributes such as hawk-like noses and bloodshot eyes". Lombroso took inspiration from Charles Darwin's recently released theories of evolution and carried many of the misunderstandings that he had regarding evolution into the propagation of the use of physiognomy in criminology. His logic stemmed from the idea that "criminals were 'throwbacks' in the phylogenetic tree to early phases of evolution". It is reasonable to conclude that "according to Lombroso, a regressive characteristic united the genius, the madman and the delinquent; they differed in the intensity of this characteristic and, naturally in the degree of development of the positive qualities". He believed that one could determine whether one was of savage nature just by their physical characteristics. Based on his findings, "Lombroso proposed that the "born criminal" could be distinguished by physical atavistic stigmata, such as:

- Large jaws, forward projection of jaw
- Low sloping forehead
- High cheekbones
- Flattened or upturned nose
- Handle-shaped ears
- Hawk-like noses or fleshy lips
- Hard shifty eyes
- Scanty beard or baldness
- Insensitivity to pain
- Long arms relative to lower limbs

This interest in the relationship between criminology and physiognomy began upon Lombroso's first interaction with "a notorious Calabrian thief and arsonist" named Giuseppe Villella. Lombroso was particularly taken by many striking personality characteristics that Villella possessed; agility and cynicism being some of them. Villella's alleged crimes are disputed and Lombroso's research is seen by many as northern Italian racism toward southern Italians. Upon Villella's death, Lombroso "conducted a post-mortem and discovered that his subject had an indentation at the back of his skull, which resembled that found in apes". He later referred to this anomaly as the "median occipital depression". Lombroso used the term "atavism" to describe these primitive, ape-like behaviors that he found in many of those whom he deemed prone to criminality. As he continued analyzing the data he gathered from Villella's autopsy and compared and contrasted those results with previous cases, he inferred that certain physical characteristics allowed for some individuals to have a greater "propensity to offend and were also savage throwbacks to early man".

These sorts of examinations yielded far-reaching consequences for various scientific and medical communities at the time, and he wrote, "the natural genesis of crime implied that the criminal personality should be regarded as a particular form of psychiatric disease"., which is an idea still seen today in psychiatry's diagnostic manual, the DSM-5, in its description of antisocial personality disorder. Furthermore, these ideas promoted the concept that when a crime is committed, it is no longer seen as "free will" but instead a result of one's genetic pre-disposition to savagery. Lombroso had numerous case studies to corroborate many of his findings due to the fact that he was the head of an insane asylum at Pesaro. He was easily able to study people from various walks of life and was thus able to further define criminal types. Because his theories primarily focused on anatomy and anthropological information, the idea of degeneracy being a source of atavism was not explored till later on in his criminological theory endeavors. These "new and improved" theories led to the notion "that the born criminal had pathological symptoms in common with the moral imbecile and the epileptic, and this led him to expand his typology to include the insane criminal and the epileptic criminal". In addition, "the insane criminal type [was said to] include the alcoholic, the mattoid, and the hysterical criminal". In the 21st century, Lombroso's ideologies are recognized as flawed and regarded as pseudo-science. Many have remarked on the overt sexist and racist overtones of his research, and denounce it for those reasons alone. In spite of many of his theories being discredited, he is still hailed as the father of "scientific criminology".

=== 20th century ===
In France, the concept was further developed in the 20th century under the name morphopsychology, developed by Louis Corman (1901–1995), a French psychiatrist who argued that the workings of vital forces within the human body resulted in different facial shapes and forms. The term "morphopsychology" is a translation of the French word morphopsychologie, which Louis Corman coined in 1937 when he wrote his first book on the subject, Quinze leçons de morphopsychologie (Fifteen Lessons of Morphopsychology).

== Present day ==
=== Social media ===
Since around 2023–2024, a resurgent discourse around physiognomy has been noted on social media among both male and female users, particularly with regard to memes, face filters, and anti-feminist and incel communities. Such content has raised concern about the normalization of pseudoscience and the idea that physical characteristics are inherently associated with one's actions and social status. Examples include the perception of leftists as being unattractive and women's femininity as dependent on their skull shape. An article in Dazed argued that these pseudosciences "[play] into the appetite to categorise ourselves".

=== Artificial intelligence ===
Artificial intelligence (AI) has been reported to heavily employ physiognomy, such as the ability to predict homosexuality, criminality, and political affiliation from images of faces or other records of outwards appearance. Critics have said that this is a result of the biased databases that AI systems are trained on, and have noted its use and potential weaponization by governments and corporations.

== Scientific investigation ==
Due to its legacy of racism and junk science masquerading as criminology, scientific study or discussion of the relationship between facial features and character has become taboo. It had previously posited many links. For example, there is evidence that character can influence facial appearance. Also, facial characteristics influence first impressions of others, which influences our expectations and behavior, which in turn influences character. Lastly, there are several biological factors that influence both facial appearance and character traits, such as pre- and post-natal hormone levels and gene expression.

The relationship between facial features and character traits such as political or sexual orientation is complex, but involves the fact that facial features can shape social behavior, partially as a result of the self-fulfilling prophecy effect. The self-fulfilling prophesy effect asserts that people perceived to have a certain attribute will be treated accordingly, and over time may engage in behaviors consistent with others' expectations of them. Conversely, social behavior such as addictions to drugs or alcohol, can shape facial features.

A February 2009 article in New Scientist magazine reported that physiognomy is undergoing a small revival, with research papers trying to find links between personality traits and facial traits. A study of 90 ice hockey players found a statistically significant correlation between a wider face—a greater than average cheekbone-to-cheekbone distance relative to the distance between brow and upper lip—and the number of penalty minutes a player received for violent acts like slashing, elbowing, checking from behind, and fighting.

This revival has continued in the 2010s with the rise of machine learning for facial recognition. For instance, researchers have claimed that it is possible to predict upper body strength and some personality traits (propensity to aggression) only by looking at the width of the face. Political orientation can also be reliably predicted. In a study that used facial recognition technology by analyzing the faces of over one million individuals, political orientation was predicted correctly 74% of the time; considerably better than chance (50%), human ability (55%) or even personality questionnaires (68%). Other studies have used AI and machine learning techniques to identify facial characteristics that predict honesty, personality, and intelligence.

Machine learning algorithms can classify faces according to other information than just facial features studied by physiognomy. This includes temporary changes to the face (makeup, facial hair style, glasses) and even circumstances completely unrelated to the face (image quality, background colors, lighting conditions). In 2017, a controversial study claimed that an AI algorithm could detect sexual orientation 'more accurately than humans' (in 81% of the tested cases for men and 71% for women), but further research showed it was this non-frenologic information that allowed for such a high accuracy.

== In media ==
- In 2011, the South Korean news agency Yonhap published a physiognomical analysis of the North Korea leader Kim Jong-un.
- In the TV series Doctor Who, as the Fourth Doctor examines his new face after regenerating in Robot, he comments on his physiognomy saying, "As for the physiognomy, well, nothing's perfect."
- The newspaper Ukrainska Pravda reported, "The fact that Putin uses [body] doubles is suggested by the intelligence data of the Ukrainian secret services and conclusions made by several specialists, in particular physiognomists."

== See also ==
- Face biometrics
- Gaydar
- Sanpaku

=== Related disciplines ===
- Anthropological criminology
- Anthropometry
- Characterology
- Mien Shiang
- Metoposcopy
- Onychomancy
- Palmistry
- Pathognomy
- Phrenology
- Somatotype and constitutional psychology
