= Ciro Spontoni =

- Born: 1550s Bologna, Papal States
- Died: 1612; Bologna, Papal States
- Occupation: Politician, writer
- Parent(s): Bartolomeo Spontoni

Ciro Spontoni (1552 – 1612) was an Italian advisor to rulers, diplomat, and historian.

== Biography ==
Born in Bologna, Spontoni served as secretary to several high-placed dignitaries in Northern Italy, including the archbishop of Ravenna; the bishop of Policastro; the Duke of Nemours, Giacomo di Savoia (Jacques, Duke of Nemours); Rodolfo Gonzaga, marchese di Castiglione, and the Duke of Mantua. He traveled with the latter to Hungary and Transylvania. He also served as secretary to the Bolognese Senate. He also published a book on Metoposcopia (Metoposcopy), a mixture of astrology and phrenologic interpretation of forehead wrinkles.

== Works ==
Among his works are:

- Dodici libri del governo dello Stato (Verona, ad istanza di Giò. Battista Pigozzo e Andrea de Rossi, 1599).
- Ragguaglio del fatto d'arme seguito nell'Africa tra Don Sebastiano, re di Portogallo (King Sebastian of Portugal) e Matei Auda Mlucco (Muley-Abdel Melck or Abu Marwan Abd al-Malik I Saadi) (1601, Bologna).
- Azioni dei re dell'Ungheria (1602, Bologna).
- Avvertimenti della storia di Guicciardini (1608, Bergamo).
- Storia della Transilvania [History of Transylvania]. Venice: Giacomo Sarzina. 1638.
- La metoposcopia overo Commensuratione delle linee della fronte...nuova fisonomia, un tratatto dei nei, & un altro dell'indole della persona, con molte curiosità. Venice: Euangelista Deuchino. 1626.
