= Palmistry =

Foretelling the future through the study of the palm

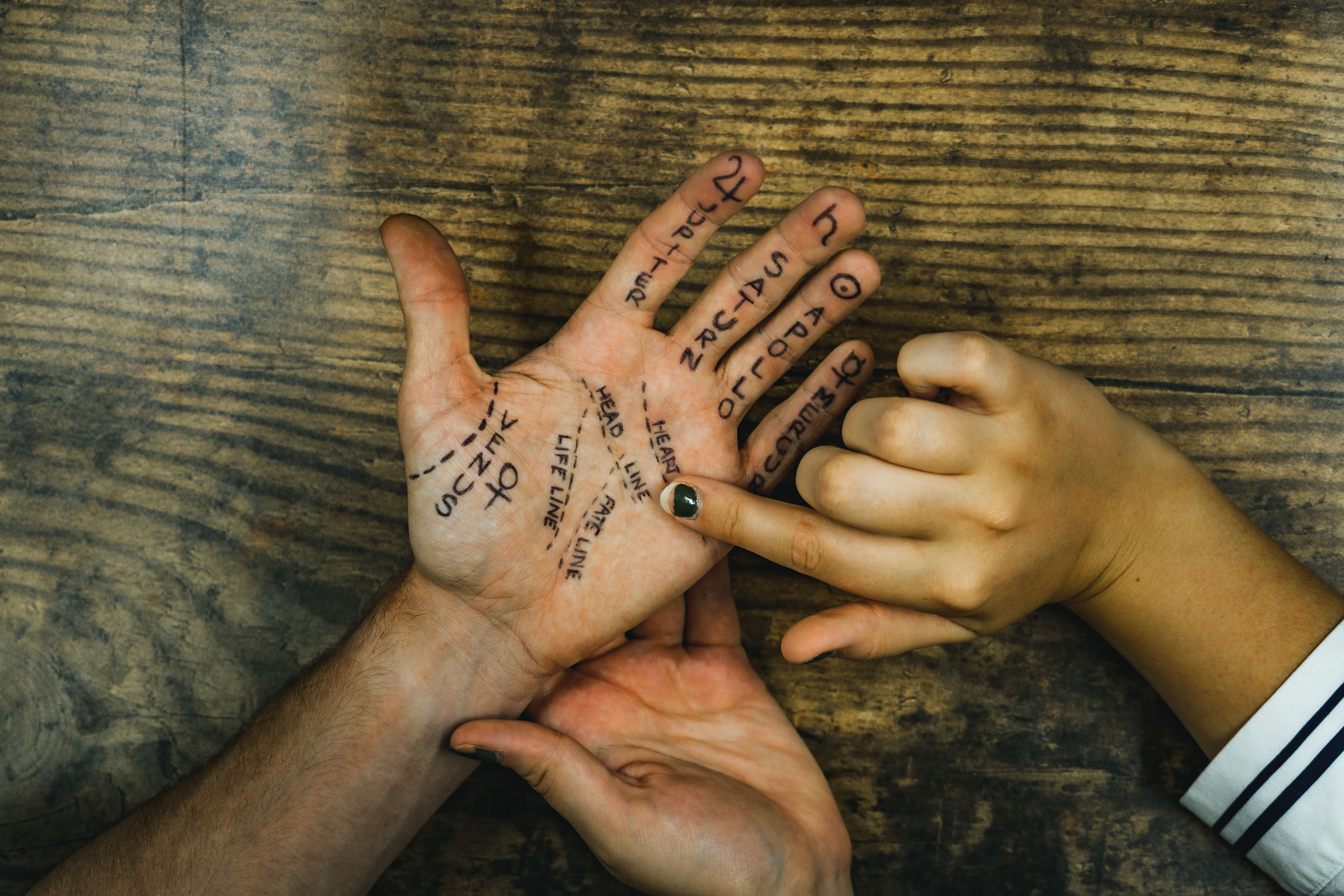
A fortune-teller conducting a palm reading, with lines and mounts marked out on the person's left palm

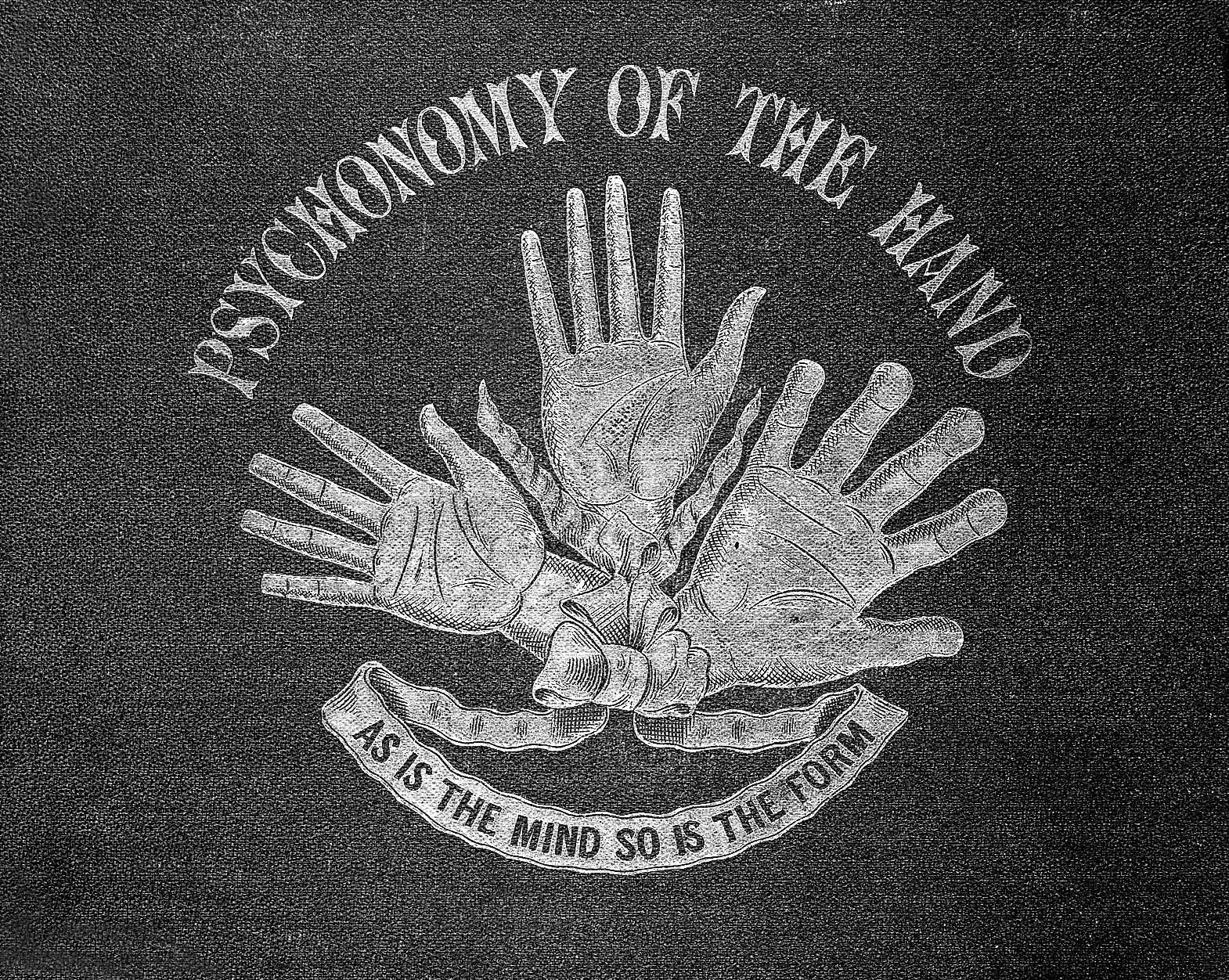
Gold stamped front cover of The Psychonomy of the Hand

Palmistry is the pseudoscientific practice of fortune-telling through the study of the palm. Also known as palm reading, chiromancy, chirology or cheirology, the practice is found all over the world, with numerous cultural variations. Those who practice palmistry are generally called palmists, palm readers, hand readers, hand analysts, or chirologists.

There are many—and often conflicting—interpretations of various lines and palmar features across various teachings of palmistry. Palmistry is widely viewed as a pseudoscience due to various contradictions between different interpretations and the lack of evidence for palmistry's predictions.

== History ==
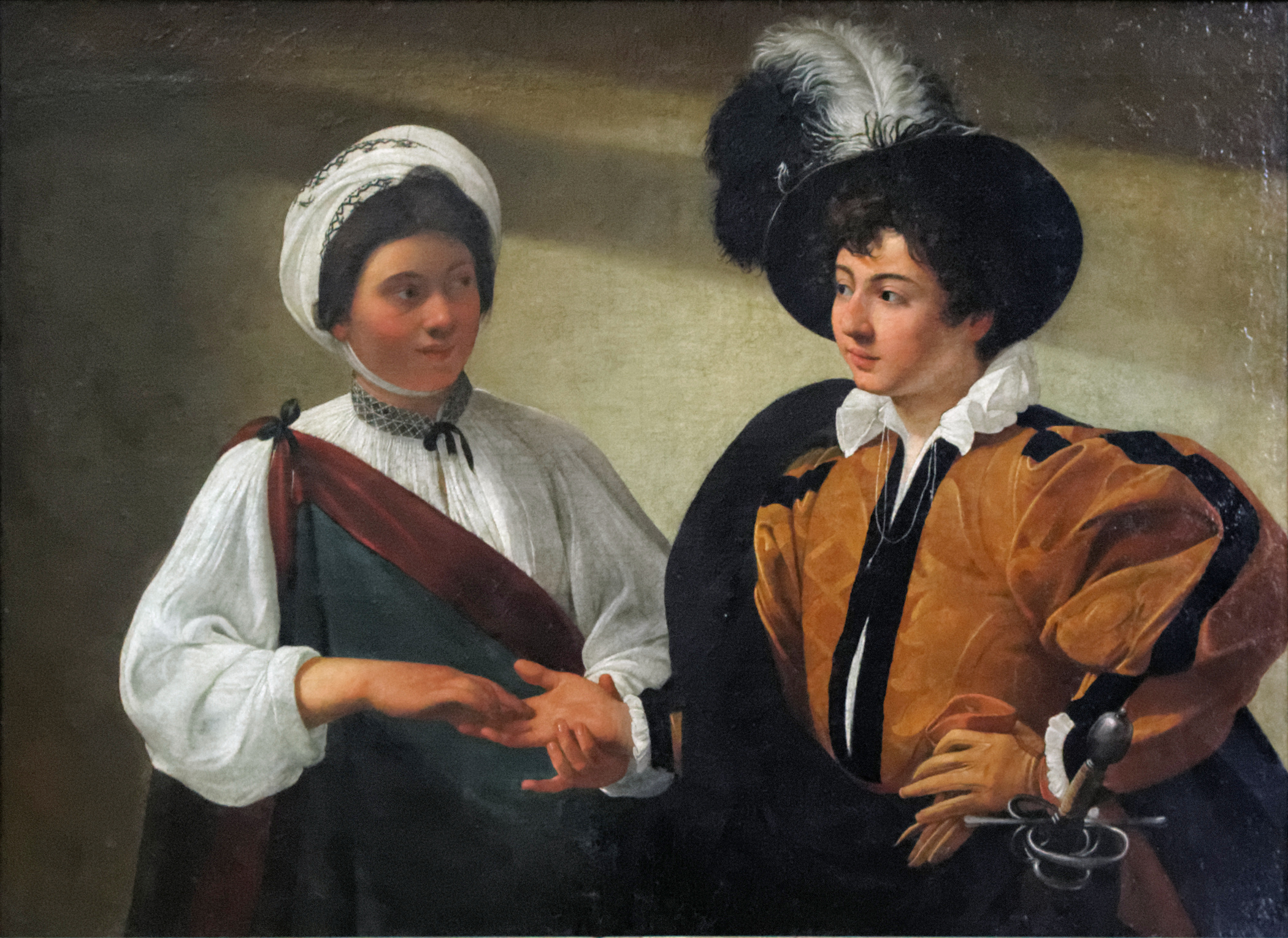
The Fortune Teller, by Caravaggio (1594–95; canvas; Louvre)

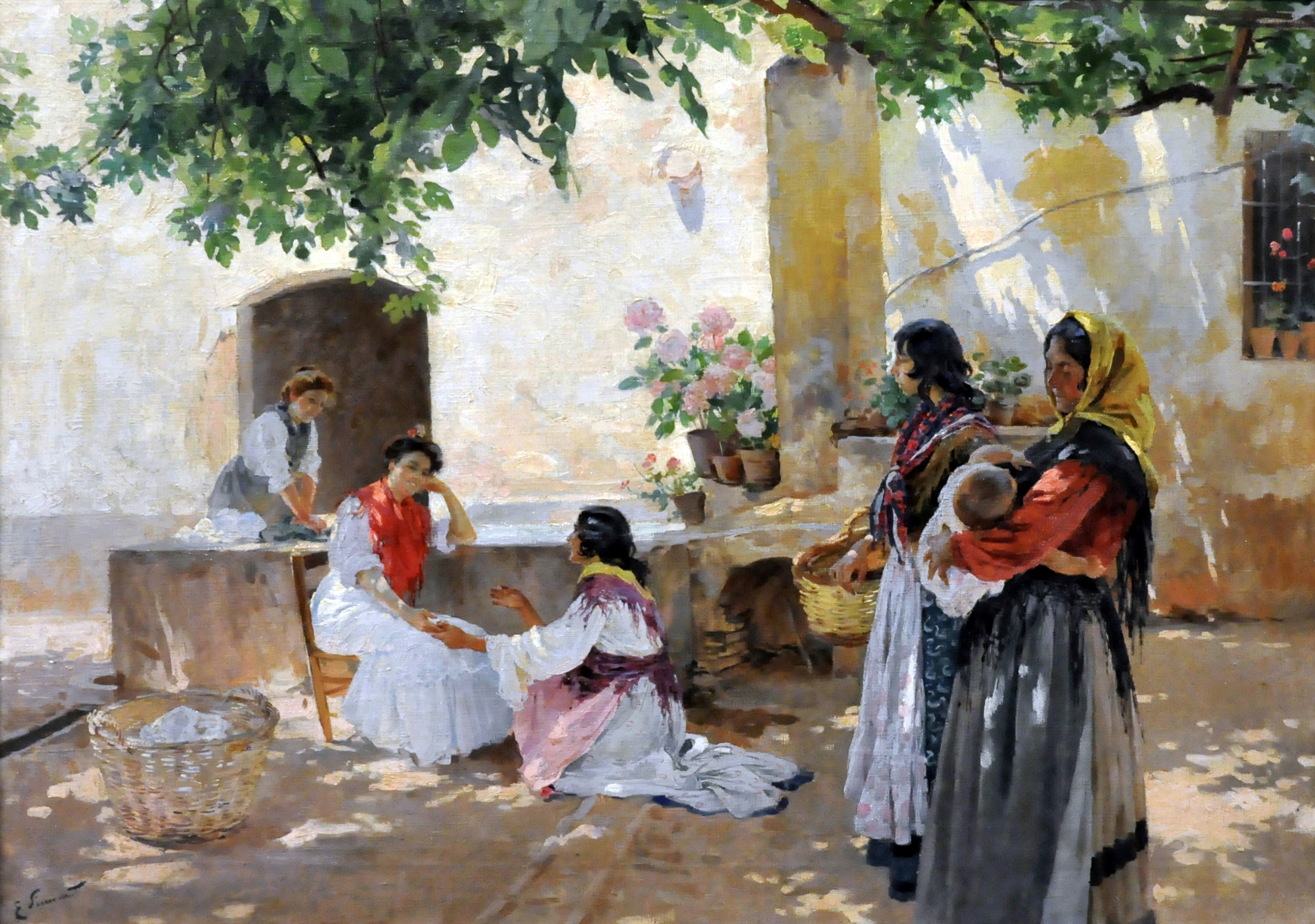
The Fortune Teller, by Enrique Simonet (1899; canvas; Museo de Málaga)

=== Ancient palmistry ===
Palmistry is a practice common to many different places on the Eurasian landmass; it has been practiced in the cultures of Sumer, Babylonia, Arabia, Canaan, Persia, India, Nepal, Tibet and China.

The acupuncturist Yoshiaki Omura describes its roots in Hindu astrology (known in Sanskrit as jyotish), Chinese Yijing (I Ching), and Romani fortune tellers. In medieval times, Sanskrit texts on palmistry start to be written, locating themselves as a branch of Sāmudrika Śāstra (Sanskrit: सामुद्रिक शास्त्र) which included the studies of marks all over a person's body such as astrology and palmistry (Hast-rekhā), as well as phrenology (kapāl-sāmudrik) and face reading (physiognomy, mukh-samudrik). From India, the art of palmistry spread to China, Tibet and to other countries in Europe.

Palmistry also progressed independently in Greece where Anaxagoras practiced it. Aristotle (384–322 B.C.E.) reportedly discovered a treatise on the subject of palmistry on an altar of Hermes, which he then presented to Alexander the Great (356–323 B.C.E.), who took great interest in examining the character of his officers by analyzing the lines on their hands. A chapter of a 17th-century sex manual, misattributed to Aristotle, is occasionally incorrectly cited as being the treatise in question. The text is not contained in his canonical works.

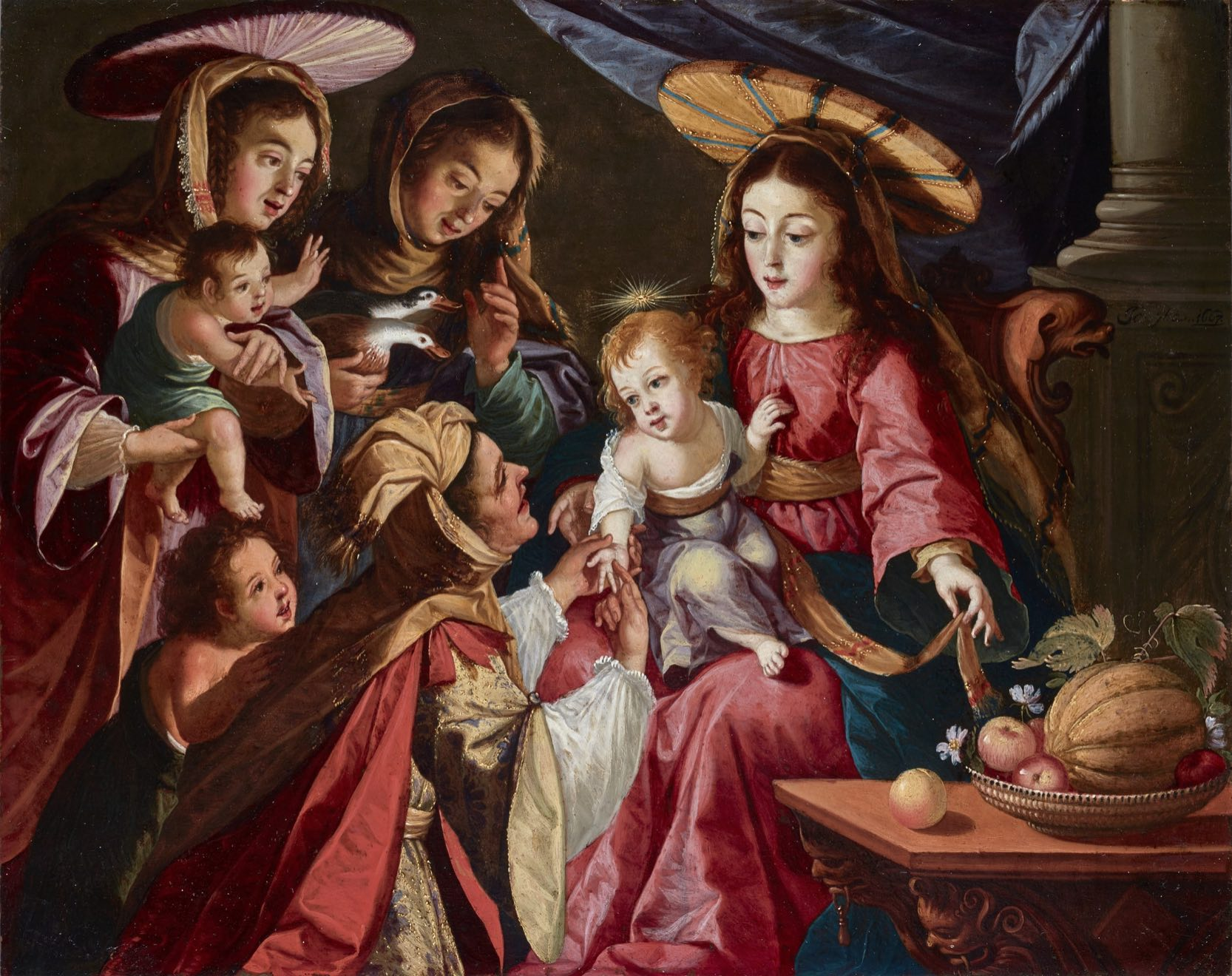
The infant Jesus having his fortune told whilst sitting on the lap of the Madonna by Josefa de Óbidos (1667)

In Renaissance magic, palmistry (known as "chiromancy") was classified as one of the seven "forbidden arts", along with necromancy, geomancy, aeromancy, pyromancy, hydromancy, and spatulamancy (scapulimancy). During the 16th century the art of palmistry was actively suppressed by the Catholic Church. Both Pope Paul IV and Pope Sixtus V issued papal edicts against various forms of divination, including palmistry.

=== Medieval European chiromancy ===
Charles B. Schmitt and Dilwyn Knox identify six Latin chiromantic treatises falsely attributed to the ancient Greek philosopher Aristotle, naming them as Chiromantia I–VI. These texts are extant in medieval manuscript witnesses dating from the thirteenth through the sixteenth centuries.

- Chiromantia I opens with the incipit "Ad sciendum artem chiromanticam" and survives in a single known fourteenth-century manuscript (London, British Library, Additional MS 15236, fols. 154–160).
- Chiromantia II has the opening line "Cum diversi diversa de arte ciromancie scripserint" and survives in multiple fifteenth- and sixteenth-century manuscript witnesses.
- Chiromantia III begins "Cum [enim] humane nature sane disposite" and survives in three manuscript witnesses dating from the fourteenth and fifteenth centuries.
- Chiromantia IV has the incipit "Cyromancia est ars demonstrans mores" and survives in multiple fourteenth- and fifteenth-century manuscript witnesses.
- Chiromantia V begins with the opening line "Linee naturales tres sunt in planities omnis ciros" and survives in several manuscript witnesses dating from the thirteenth through the fifteenth centuries.
- Chiromantia VI begins "Secantur [sive Distingunnt] sciencie" and survives in numerous fourteenth- and fifteenth-century manuscript witnesses.

The attribution of these texts is not consistent across the manuscript tradition. In addition to Aristotle, individual witnesses attribute certain treatises to other historical figures, including Averroes, Regiomontanus, and Pietro d'Abano. These varying attributions show the complex history of authorship and textual transmission within the medieval Latin tradition.

=== Modern palmistry ===
Palmistry experienced a revival in the modern era starting with Captain Casimir Stanislas D'Arpentigny's publication La Chirognomie in 1839. The Chirological Society of Great Britain was founded in London by Katharine St. Hill in 1889 with the stated aim to advance and systematise the art of palmistry and to prevent charlatans from abusing the art. Edgar de Valcourt-Vermont (Comte C. de Saint-Germain) founded the American Chirological Society in 1897.

A pivotal figure in the modern palmistry movement was the Irish William John Warner, known by his sobriquet, Cheiro. After studying under gurus in India, he set up a palmistry practice in London and enjoyed a wide following of famous clients from around the world, including famous celebrities like Mark Twain, W. T. Stead, Sarah Bernhardt, Mata Hari, Oscar Wilde, Grover Cleveland, Thomas Edison, the Prince of Wales, General Kitchener, William Ewart Gladstone, and Joseph Chamberlain. So popular was Cheiro as a "society palmist" that even those who were not believers in the occult had their hands read by him. The skeptical Mark Twain wrote in Cheiro's visitor's book that he had "exposed my character to me with humiliating accuracy".

Edward Heron-Allen, an English polymath, published various works including the 1883 book, Palmistry: A Manual of Cheirosophy, which is still in print. There were attempts at formulating some sort of scientific basis for the art, most notably in the 1900 publication The Laws of Scientific Hand Reading by William Gurney Benham.

In 1970, Parker Brothers published a game designed by Maxine Lucille Fiel called "Touch-Game of Palmistry" which allowed players to do "palm reading and analysis" through selecting cards that matched designated palm features.

In 2007, writer Johnny Fincham released the book "Palmistry: From Apprentice to Pro", demonstrating his approach which differs from the traditional by focusing more on lines.

Cheiro, an influential exponent of palmistry in the late 19th and early 20th centuries

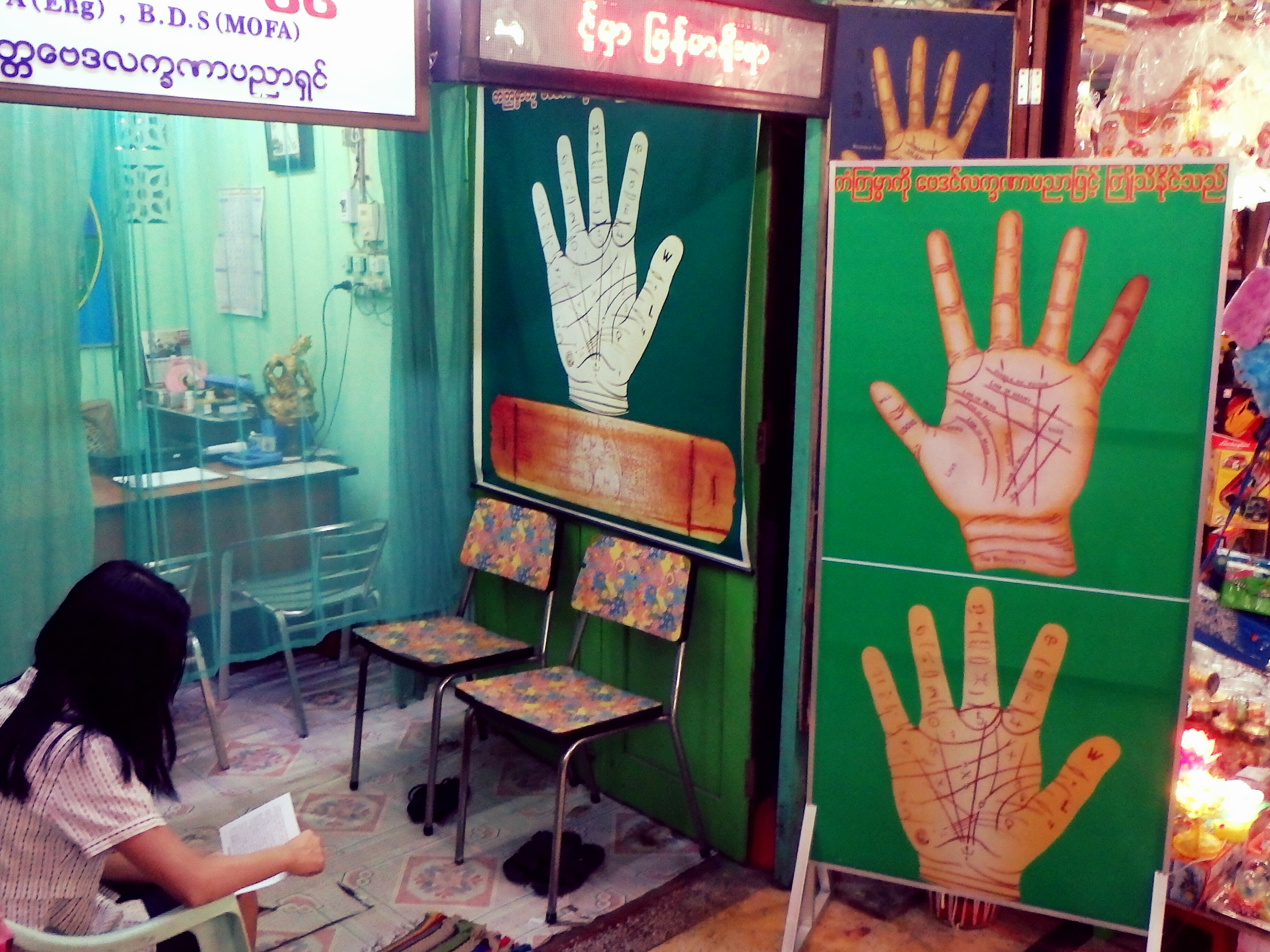
A modern palm-reader's shop in Yangon, Myanmar

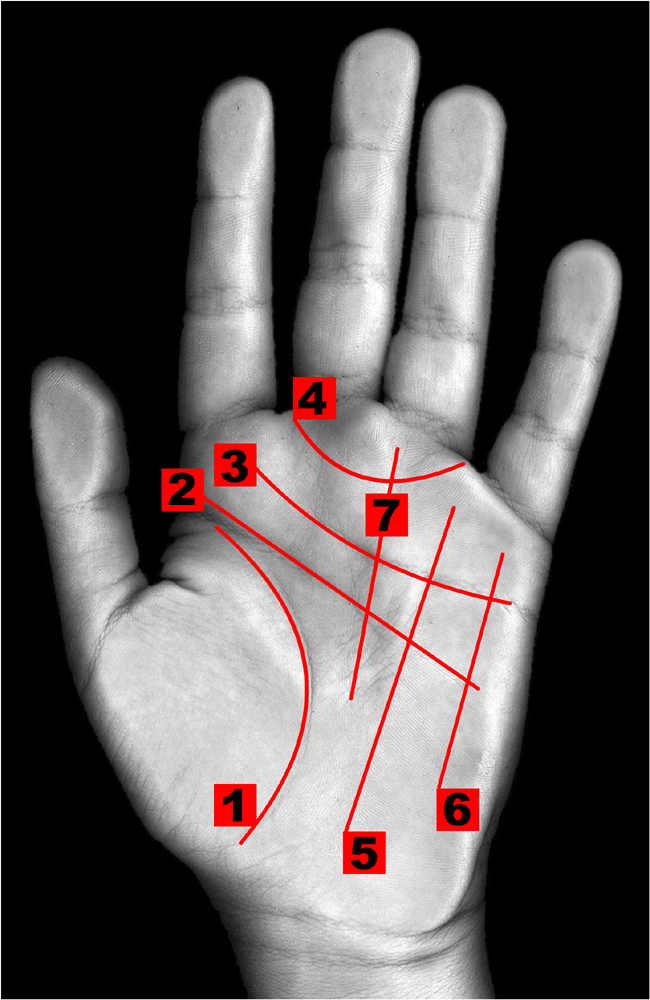
Some of the lines of the hand in palmistry:
1. Life line
2. Head line
3. Heart line
4. Girdle of Venus
5. Sun line
6. Mercury line
7. Fate line

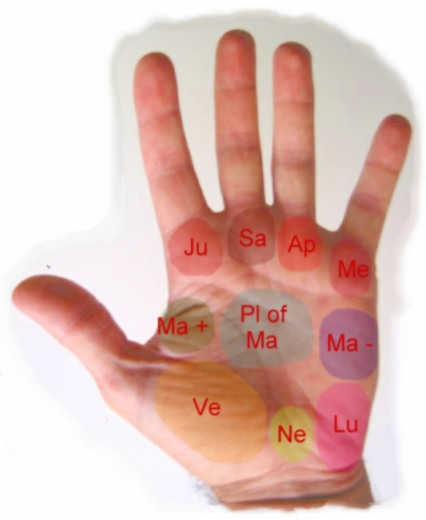
The mounts in palmistry: Jupiter, Saturn, Apollo, Mercury, Mars positive, Mars negative, plain of Mars, Luna mount, Neptune mount, Venus mount

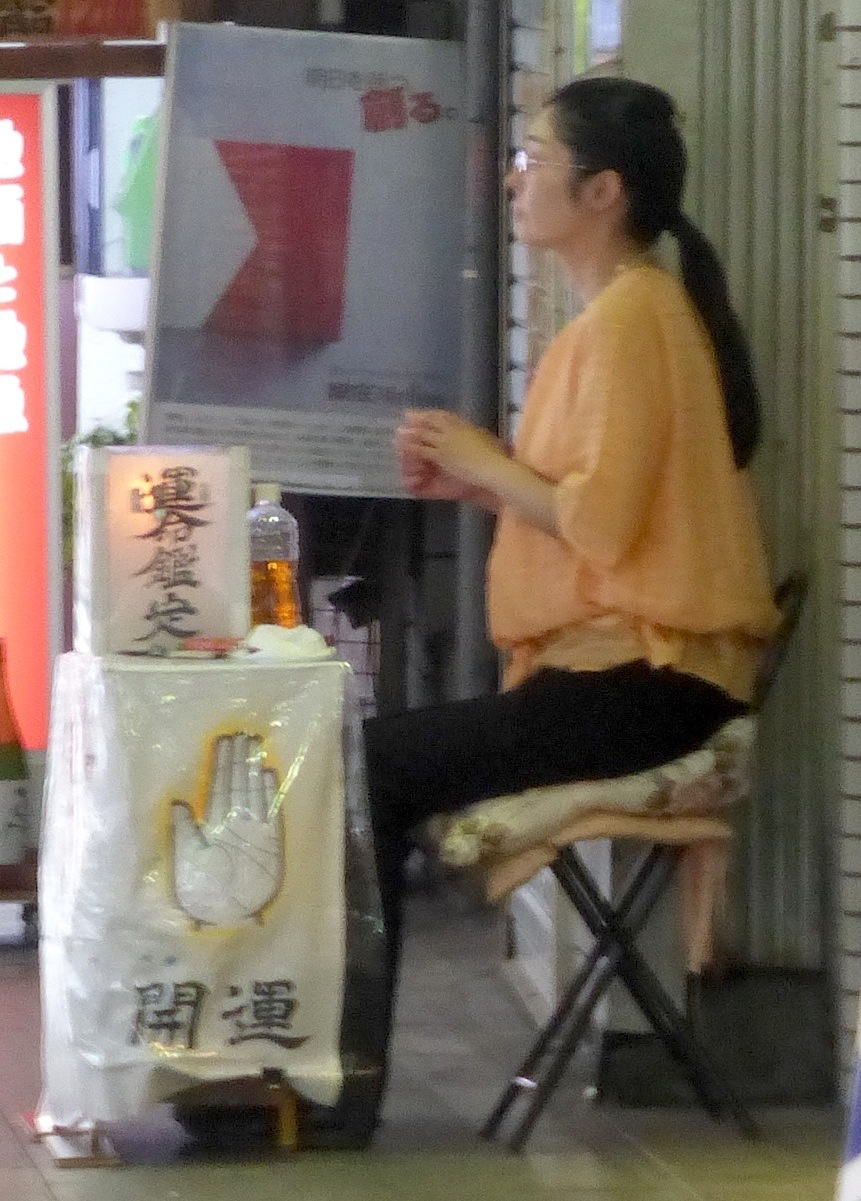
A Japanese palm-reader waits along the street for a customer, 2015

== Relationship with dermatoglyphics ==
Dermatoglyphics and palmistry both study the intricate features of the human palm, like fingerprints, creases, shapes, and mounts, but their purposes differ greatly. Dermatoglyphics is a scientific field examining these patterns for genetic and medical insights, while palmistry interprets them to reveal personality traits and predict future events. The former relies on empirical data, whereas the latter is based on the 12th-century text Samudrika Shastra.

== Criticism ==
Scientific literature regards palmistry as a pseudoscientific or superstitious belief. Psychologist and noted skeptic Ray Hyman has written:

I started reading palms in my teens as a way to supplement my income from doing magic and mental shows. When I started I did not believe in palmistry. But I knew that to "sell" it I had to act as if I did. After a few years I became a firm believer in palmistry. One day the late Stanley Jaks, who was a professional mentalist and a man I respected, tactfully suggested that it would make an interesting experiment if I deliberately gave readings opposite to what the lines indicated. I tried this out with a few clients. To my surprise and horror my readings were just as successful as ever. Ever since then I have been interested in the powerful forces that convince us, reader and client alike, that something is so when it really isn't.

Skeptics often include palmists on lists of alleged psychics who practice cold reading. Cold reading is the practice that allows readers of all kinds, including palmists, to appear psychic by using high-probability guessing and inferring details based on signals or cues from the other person. Although some Christians condemn palmistry as a form of divination, Jewish and Christian traditions are largely ambivalent about divination in general. During the 16th century the Catholic Church condemned the practice of palmistry. However, there is a long tradition of practicing palmistry within both Jewish and Christian mysticism, and some practitioners, such as Comte C. de Saint-Germain, have argued that the Bible does not oppose it.

== See also ==
- List of topics characterized as pseudoscience
- Methods of divination
- Alectryomancy
- Chironomia
- Digit ratio
- Graphology
- Onychomancy
- Phrenology
- Physiognomy
- Reflexology
- Single transverse palmar crease
- Tarot
- Tasseography
