= Mien Shiang =

Traditional Chinese face reading

Mien shiang (Chinese: 面相; pinyin: miànxiàng meaning face (mien) reading (shiang)) is a physiognomic and fortune-telling practice in Chinese culture and traditional Chinese medicine which purports to determine aspects of person's character, personality, and (future) health by analyzing their face according to the five phases ("wu xing"). The five phases (namely wood, fire, earth, metal, and water) are metaphors devised by ancient Chinese philosophers to explain the relationship, interaction, and ongoing change of everything in the universe.

== Historical records ==
There are early written records of mien shiang. In Book of Rites, it writes, "Those who look up are arrogant; Those who look down are worried; Those who look sideways are sly". After Gou Jian (勾践) of Yue (c. 470 BCE) settled the State of Wu, Fan Li (范蠡) (536–488 BCE) knew that Gou Jian had a "long neck and sharp upper lips", which meant they could face hardship together but not enjoy peace together. Fan Li later fled with Xi Shi (西施) to the State of Qi and changed their names to lead a new life. Another historical example in which Mien Shiang was used was Wang Anshi (王安石) of Song Dynasty. Wang's eyes resembled those of an ox, and his head was shaped like those of tigers. It was said that if Wang could stare straight at the sun, he had a face with good fortune (贵相).

== Mien shiang terminology ==
The words below are a description of mien shiang terminology, such as "three parts of one's face" (三亭) which includes the upper part (上亭), middle part (中亭), and lower part (下亭).

1. Yin-Yang (陰陽)
2. Three parts of one's face (三停) are the upper part, middle part, and lower part.
3. Upper part (上停) is area between the forehead between the hairline and eyebrows. This section represents the fortune between ages 10 to 20, which is one's youth.
4. Middle part (中停) is the area between the eyebrows and the bottom of the nose. This section represents the fortune between ages 20 to 40, which is one's adult years.
5. Lower part (下停) is the area between the bottom of the nose to the chin. This section represents the fortune after ages 40, which is one's older adult years.
6. Five organs on one's face (五官) includes one's ears, eyebrows, eyes, nose, and mouth.
7. Face Shape (面型) includes ten major kinds: You (由), Jia (甲), Shen (申), Tian (田), Tong (同), Wang (王), Yuan (圓), Mu (目), Yong (用), and Feng (風).
8. Twelve Houses (十二宮) includes the 12 basic parts on one's face that represent different aspects of life. They are the life house (命宮), wealth house (財帛宮), sibling house (兄弟宮), marriage house (夫妻宮), children house (子女宮), health house (疾危宮), travelling house (遷移宮), assistant house (奴僕宮), career house (官祿宮), property house (田宅宮), fortune & emotion house (福德宮), and parents house (父母宮).
9. Wrinkle (紋), scar (痕), mole (痣), speckle (斑).
10. Nei Shiang (內相) is the internal aspect of the body including shoulders, waist, back, chest, abdomen, umbilicus, forearms, limbs, neck, breasts (for women), and others.
11. Gu Shiang (骨相) is bone reading, including the skull and the bones in the body.
12. Dong Shiang (動相) is the individual's movement, including walking (行相), sitting and standing (坐立相), eating (食相), lying (臥相), crying (哭相), and laughing (笑相).
13. Sheng Shiang (聲相) is the sounds that one makes.

== See also ==
- Metoposcopy
- Physiognomy
- Phrenology
