= Metoposcopy =

Art of divining a person's future from the lines on their forehead

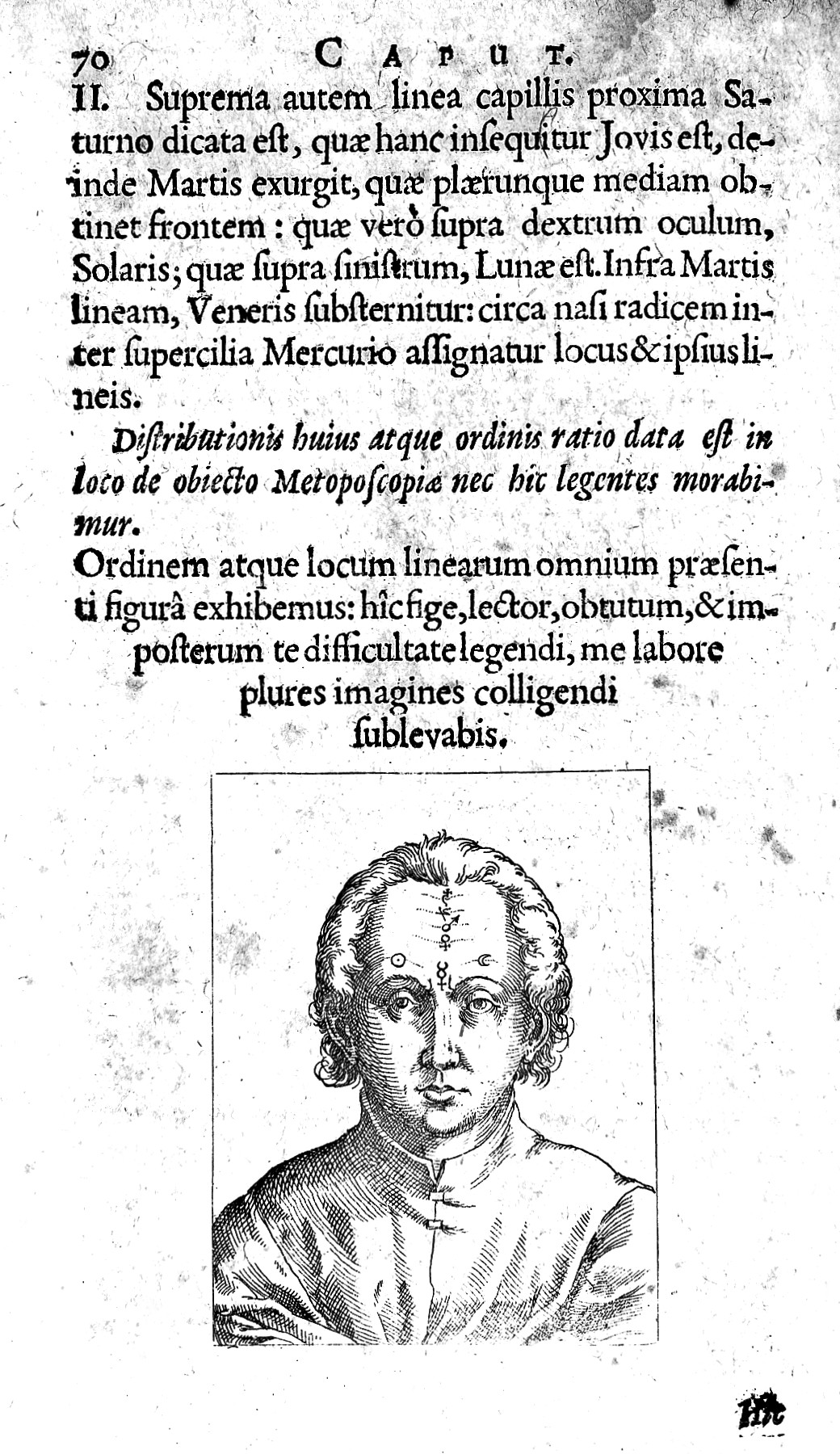
Diagram from Metoposcopia, Samuel Fuchs, 1615

Metoposcopy is a form of divination in which the diviner predicts personality, character, and destiny, based on the pattern of lines on the subject's forehead. It was in use in the classical era, and was widespread in the Middle Ages, reaching its zenith in the 16th and 17th centuries.

== History ==
Pliny mentions a metoposcopos, described by Appion the Grammarian, who ("a thing incredible to be spoken") could judge a person's age and how much longer they would live. According to Suetonius, another practitioner determined that Titus, and not Britannicus, would become Emperor. Juvenal was disdainful, and considered metoposcopy to be plebeian.

Metoposcopy is prominently featured in the Zohar. Isaac Luria (1534 - 1572), a Syrian rabbi considered to be the founder of contemporary Kabbalah, practised a form of metoposcopy in which he interpreted the appearance of Hebrew letters on the forehead.

Metoposcopy was developed by the 16th century Italian polymath Gerolamo Cardano, considered to be one of the foremost mathematicians of the Renaissance. His seminal work Metoposcopia libris tredecim, et octingentis faciei humanae eiconibus complexa, illustrated with engravings of 800 foreheads, was written in 1558 and published posthumously in 1658. Giovanni Antonio Magini was also interested in the subject. Ciro Spontoni published an illustrated text on the practice. Many metoposcopy books were published in the 16th and 17th centuries.

== Criticism ==
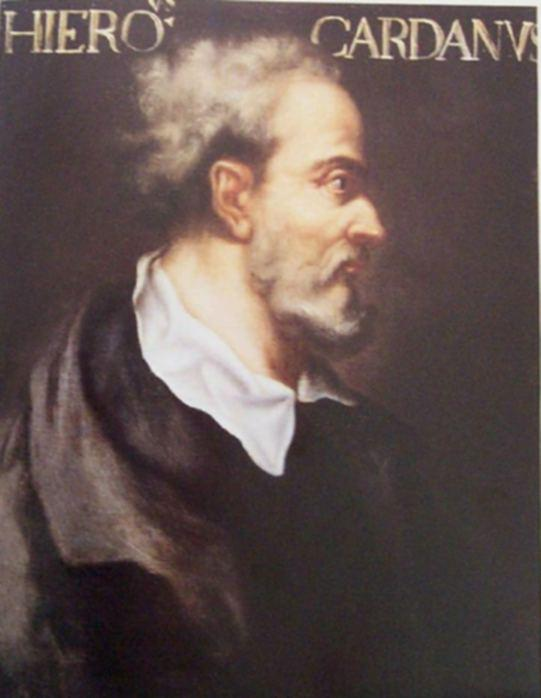
Portrait of Cardano on display at the School of Mathematics and Statistics, University of St Andrews.

Jean Bodin denounced metoposcopy in his influential work De la démonomanie des sorciers (1580). The practise was banned by Pope Sixtus V in 1586.

== See also ==
- Frontispiece (book)
- Physiognomy
