= Al-Farabi =

Islamic philosopher and music theorist (c. 870 – 950/951)

al-Farabi Abu Nasr al-Farabi
- أبو نصر الفارابي
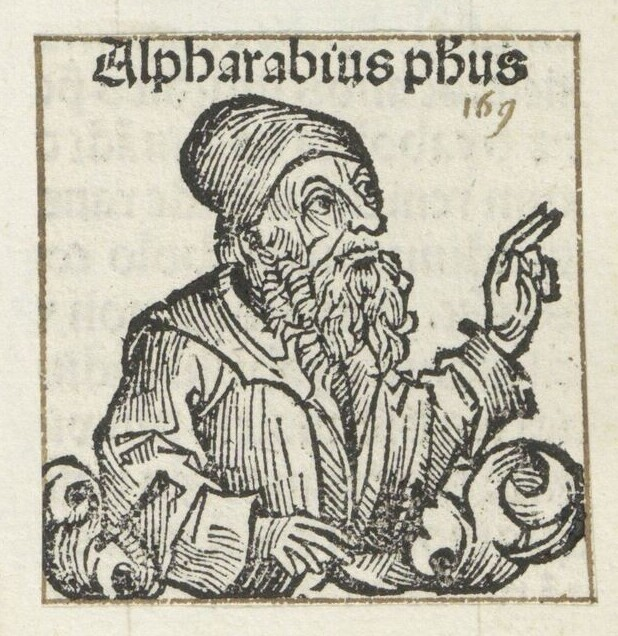
- Portrait of Al-Farabi—Alpharabius (Note: Artistic impression of Farabi, in the Liber Chronicarum, by Hartmann Schedel, finished in 1493 AD. Note that this woodcut is reused throughout the Nuremberg Chronicle, where it also represents Anaxagoras, Isocrates, Boethius and others.)
- Born: c. 258 AH | c. 870–872 CE; Farab
- Died: 339 AH | c. 950–951 CE; Damascus
- Other names: Second Master, Alpharabius
- Occupations: Philosopher, logician, music theorist and political philosopher
- Known for: Islamic philosophy, logic, political philosophy and music theory

Education
- Education: Studied logic under Yūḥannā ibn Ḥaylān and Abū Bishr Mattā ibn Yūnus

Philosophical work
- Era: Islamic Golden Age
- Region: Islamic philosophy
- School: Aristotelianism · Neoplatonism
- Notable students: Yahya ibn Adi
- Main interests: Political Philosophy · Philosophy of Religion · Physics · Metaphysics · Logic · Psychology · Epistemology · Ethics · Music Theory
- Notable works: Kitab al-Musiqi al-Kabir ("Grand Book of Music"), (Note: The Wikipedia entry Kitab al-Musiqa al-Kabir (Arabic: كتاب الموُسَيَقي الكِبَير, romanized: Kitāb al-mūsīqī al-kabīr), has the Great Book of Music; Grand, is according to the French translation, by Rodolphe d'Erlanger (La musique arabe, Tome I-II: Fārābī, Grand Traité de la Musique), and Madian (Language-Music Relationships in Fārābī's Grand Book of Music, PhD. diss., Cornell University, 1992) → Sawa 2012. $\mathrm{N}\!\!\mathrm{B}$: Musiqi, later Musiqa, is the Arabic term for music, the correct title of Farabi's book is as aforementioned with Romanization; Touma 1996, p. 10, has al-Musiqa, but Western scholarly works all have al-Musiqi → Farmer, Henry G. (1913–1936). "Mūsīḳī". In Martijn Theodoor Houtsma; et al. (eds.). Encyclopaedia of Islam. Vol. III (1st ed.). Leiden: Brill. pp. 749b–755b (esp. p. 751b). doi:10.1163/2214-871X_ei1_SIM_4900. ISBN 90-04-08265-4.; Neubauer, Eckhard (February 20, 2009). Ehsan Yarshater (ed.). "Music History ii. ca. 650 to 1370 CE". Encyclopædia Iranica. Encyclopædia Iranica Foundation.; Wright, Owen (1954–2007) [1992]. "Mūsīḳī, later Mūsīḳā". In H. A. R. Gibb; et al. (eds.). Encyclopaedia of Islam. Vol. VII (2nd ed.). Leiden: Brill. pp. 681a–688b (esp. 682b). doi:10.1163/1573-3912_islam_COM_0812. ISBN 90-04-07026-5..) Ara Ahl al-Madina al-Fadila ("Virtuous City"), (Note: Virtuous City, has several names in Arabic: 1. (Arabic: آراءُ اَهْلِ الْمَدینَةِ الْفاضِلَة, romanized: Ārā’ ahl al-madīna al-fāḍila); 2. (Arabic: مبادئ آراءُ اَهْلِ الْمَدینَةِ الْفاضِلَة, romanized: Mabādi’ ārā’ ahl al-madīna al-fāḍila); 3. (Arabic: آراءُ اَهْلِ الْمَدینَةِ الْفاضِلَة والمضاداتها, romanized: Ārā’ ahl al-madīna al-fāḍila wa-lʼmuḍāddātihā); last name might appear in Eastern publications. In Western academic works, they as a rule interpret the final two words of the Arabic title (i.e., al-Madina al-fadila) into: Excellent State, Ideal State, Perfect State, and Virtuous City, the final name is most common. However, some scholars interpret the complete titles into 1. Opinions of The Citizens of The Virtuous City; 2. Principles of the Opinions of the Citizens of the Virtuous City. Note that synonym(s) might be utilized as well (e.g., Ideal City, for Ideal State; or People, Inhabitants, for Citizens, etc.). I have included this tag to distinctive titles used within the article, thus the readers won't get confused.) Kitab Ihsa al-Ulum ("Enumeration of the Sciences"), (Note: Enumeration of the Sciences, (Arabic: كتاب إحصاء العُلوُم, romanized: Kitāb iḥṣā’ al-‘ulūm), known in the Latin West as De scientiis, is the established English name of this book → Druart 2021, § 1. Former academic works may refer to it as Classification of Sciences; e.g., Madkour 1963–1966, p. 453.) Risalah fi'l-Aql (Epistle on the Intellect) (Note: Epistle on the Intellect, or Treatise on the Intellect (Arabic: رسالة فى العقل, romanized: Risālah fi’l-‘aql), known in the Latin West as De intellectu → López-Farjeat 2020, § 4.)
- Notable ideas: Father of Islamic Neoplatonism, Founder of Islamic Political Philosophy

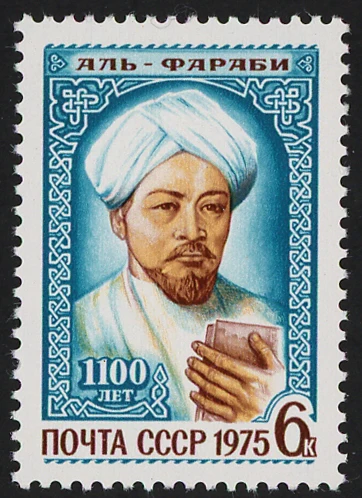
Postage stamp of the USSR, issued on the 1100th anniversary of the birth of Al-Farabi (1975)

Abu Nasr Muhammad al-Farabi (Arabic: أبو نصر محمد الفارابي, romanized: Abū Naṣr Muḥammad al-Fārābī; c. 870 (Note: The date of Farabi's birth is unknown → Gutas 2012a, § Life; Rudolph 2017, p. 537; Vallat 2020, p. 551a. Ibn Khallikan claims that Farabi died at the age of 80, meaning 80 Lunar, i.e., c. 78 Solar years, isn't/aren't any other source(s) to prove or disprove Ibn Khallikan's claim? Based on his statement, Henry Corbin, correctly, gives the date of Farabi's birth as c. 872; however, after the publication of the article by Mahdi & Wright 1970–1980, decisively giving c. 870–950, scholars followed suit till today. The date of Farabi's death is more precise.) – 14 December 950–12 January 951), known in the Latin West as Alpharabius, (Note: Alternative names include: Abunaser, Alfarabi, Avenassar, and Farabi.) was an early Islamic philosopher and music theorist. He has been designated as "Father of Islamic Neoplatonism", and the "Founder of Islamic Political Philosophy".

Al-Farabi's fields of philosophical interest included—but were not limited to—philosophy of society and religion; philosophy of language and logic; psychology and epistemology; metaphysics, political philosophy, and ethics. He was an expert in both practical musicianship and music theory, and although he was not intrinsically a scientist, his works incorporate astronomy, mathematics, cosmology, and physics.

Al-Farabi is credited as the first Muslim who presented philosophy as a coherent system in the Islamic world, and created a philosophical system of his own, which went far beyond the scholastic interests of his Greco-Roman Neoplatonism and Syriac Aristotelian precursors. (Note: For the Syriac Aristotelian tradition → Watt, John W. (2015). "The Syriac Aristotelian Tradition and the Syro-Arabic Baghdad Philosophers". In Damien Janos (ed.). Ideas in Motion in Baghdad and Beyond: Philosophical and Theological Exchanges between Christians and Muslims in the Third/Ninth and Fourth/Tenth Centuries. Islamic History and Civilization. Studies and Texts. Volume 124. Leiden: Brill. pp. 7–43. doi:10.1163/9789004306264_003. ISBN 978-90-04-30602-8. ISSN 0929-2403.) That he was more than a pioneer in Islamic philosophy is evident from later writers calling him the "Second Master", (Note: Farabi's honorific title, the "Second Master" (Arabic: المُعَلّم الثاني, romanized: al-Mu‘allim al-thānī), is also interpreted as "Second Teacher" → Netton 1994, p. 99.) with Aristotle as the first.

Philosophers influenced by Al-Farabi include Yahya ibn Adi, Abu Sulayman Sijistani, Abu al-Hassan al-Amiri, and Abu Hayyan al-Tawhidi; Avicenna, Suhrawardi, and Mulla Sadra; Avempace, Ibn Tufail, and Averroes; Maimonides, Albertus Magnus, and Leo Strauss. He was known in the Latin West, as well as the Islamic world.

== Biography ==
The existing variations in the basic accounts of al-Farabi's origins and pedigree indicate that they were not recorded during his lifetime or soon thereafter by anyone with concrete information, but were based on hearsay or guesses (as is the case with other contemporaries of al-Farabi). Little is known about his life. Early sources include an autobiographical passage where al-Farabi traces the history of logic and philosophy up to his time, and brief mentions by al-Masudi, Ibn al-Nadim and Ibn Hawqal. Said al-Andalusi wrote a biography of al-Farabi. Arabic biographers of the 12th–13th centuries thus had few facts to hand, and used invented stories about his life.

From incidental accounts it is known that he spent significant time (most of his scholarly life) in Baghdad with Syriac Christian scholars, (Note: Syriac Christian. Reisman doesn't define which branch of Eastern Christianity they belonged to. He only states: "This association with Christian scholarly circles in Baghdad links Farabi to the Syriac neo-Aristotelian tradition ..." → Reisman 2005, p. 53.) including the cleric Yuhanna ibn Haylan, Yahya ibn Adi, and Abu Ishaq Ibrahim al-Baghdadi. He later spent time in Damascus and in Egypt before returning to Damascus where he died in 950–951.

His name was Abu Nasr Muhammad ibn Muhammad al-Farabi, sometimes with the family surname al-Tarkhani, i.e., the element Tarkhan appears in a nisba. His grandfather was not known among his contemporaries, but a name Awzalagh, (Note: Gutas 2012a, § Stories and Legends: In modern Turkish scholarship the pronunciation is given as Uzlug[h] (İA V, p. 451), without any explanation. → Kaya, Mahmut; Alaeddin Jebrini (1995). "Fârâbî: Ebû Nasr Muhammed b. Muhammed b. Tarhan b. Uzluğ el-Fârâbî et-Türkî (ِö. 339/950)". In Tahsin Yazıcı; et al. (eds.). İslâm Ansiklopedisi (in Turkish).) in Arabic, suddenly appears later in the writings of Ibn Abi Usaybi'a, and of his great-grandfather in those of Ibn Khallikan. There is no earlier account before the 13th century that mentions his origins in detail outside of place of origin.

His birthplace could have been any one of the many places in Central Asia—then known by the name of Khurasan. The word farab is a Persian term for a locale that is irrigated by effluent springs or flows from a nearby river. Thus, there are many places that carry the name (or various evolutions of that toponym) in that general area, such as Farab (Otrar) on the Jaxartes (Syr Darya) in modern Kazakhstan; Farab, an still-extant village in suburbs of the city of Chaharjuy/Amul (modern Türkmenabat) on the Oxus Amu Darya in Turkmenistan, on the Silk Road, connecting Merv to Bukhara, or Faryab in Greater Khorasan (modern day Afghanistan). The older Persian Parab (in Hudud ul-'alam) or Faryab (also Paryab), is a common Persian toponym meaning "lands irrigated by diversion of river water".

=== Background ===
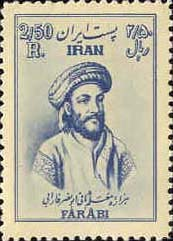
Iranian stamp with al-Farabi's imagined face

While some scholars claim that his ethnic background is not knowable, others describe him as being of either Persian or Turkic origin. Al-Fārābī’s ethnic origins remain disputed, with scholars variously attributing Persian or Turkic ancestry to him or considering the available evidence inconclusive. The thirteenth-century biographer Ibn Abī Uṣaybiʿa describes his father as an army commander of Persian descent, while al-Shahrazūrī also attributes Persian origins to him. Ibn Khallikān’s Wafayāt al-aʿyān, completed in 1271, describes al-Fārābī as Turkic. These accounts were written approximately three centuries after al-Fārābī’s death.

The twelfth-century biographer Ẓahīr al-Dīn al-Bayhaqī (d. 1169), in his Tatimmat Ṣiwān al-ḥikma, places al-Fārābī’s origins in “Fārāb in Turkestan” and describes him as short and scantily bearded, “with the appearance of some Turks” (ʿalā hayʾat baʿḍ al-atrāk). This description precedes Ibn Abī Uṣaybiʿa’s thirteenth-century statement that al-Fārābī’s father was an army commander of Persian descent, identified by Dimitri Gutas as the first explicit attribution of Persian parentage by an extant biographer. Al-Bayhaqī’s comparison concerns appearance rather than explicitly asserting Turkic ancestry and occurs in an anecdote about al-Fārābī visiting al-Ṣāḥib ibn ʿAbbād in Ray. Gutas questions this narrative because Ibn ʿAbbād was only about twelve when al-Fārābī died, while nevertheless recognizing the value of al-Bayhaqī’s bibliographical observations. Ibn Abī Uṣaybiʿa reproduces a report dating al-Fārābī’s return to Damascus to 339 AH/950 and placing it during the caliphate of al-Rāḍī. In reality, Al-Rāḍī’s reign is dated to 934–940. Ibn Abī Uṣaybiʿa also describes al-Fārābī’s father as an army officer of Persian origin, without identifying his army or place of service.

Dimitri Gutas considers the surviving evidence insufficient to determine al-Fārābī’s ethnicity. Although he notes Persian, Sogdian and Greek linguistic examples in al-Fārābī’s works, and no Turkish examples, he does not regard the question as settled Sogdian has also been suggested as his native language (incorrectly described as a Turkic language) and the language of the inhabitants of Farab (same source also proposes a "Turkic dialect"). Thérèse-Anne Druart, writing in the Stanford Encyclopedia of Philosophy, describes more recent research as favouring Persian origins. Ulrich Rudolph’s survey (which Druart cites exclusively in the section regarding the origins of Al-Farabi in her article for Stanford Encyclopedia of Philosophy) presents the issue more cautiously, reporting Gutas’s agnostic conclusion alongside Philippe Vallat’s argument for Persian ancestry.

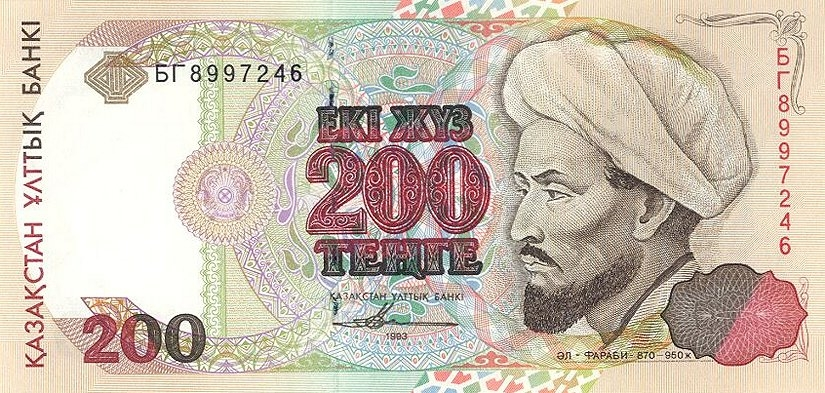
al-Farabi on the currency of the Republic of Kazakhstan

The oldest known reference to a Turkic origin is given by the medieval historian Ibn Khallikan (died in 1282), who in his work Wafayat (completed in 669/1271, called the "best general biography ever written" by the British scholar Reynold A. Nicholson) states that al-Farabi was born in the small village of Wasij near Farab (in what is today Otrar, Kazakhstan) of Turkic parents. The evidence concerning Turkic names is not confined to Ibn Khallikān: the designation al-Ṭarkhānī occurs in manuscripts of al-Fārābī’s works, while Awzalaġ appears in Ibn Abī Uṣaybiʿa’s genealogy, alongside his statement that al-Fārābī’s father was of Persian descent. The sources differ over the ordering of the ancestral names. Based on this account, some scholars say he is of Turkic origin. Dimitri Gutas interprets Ibn Khallikān’s account as an attempt to establish Turkic ancestry in response to Ibn Abī Uṣaybiʿa’s assertion of Persian descent. He regards al-Turkī as an addition by Ibn Khallikān rather than an authentic designation of al-Fārābī. Abū al-Fidāʾ also describes al-Fārābī as a Turkic man, in an account that Gutas considers dependent on Ibn Khallikān. Gutas concludes that the surviving evidence is insufficient to determine al-Fārābī’s ethnic origins.

=== Life and education ===
Al-Farabi spent most of his scholarly life in Baghdad. In the autobiographical passage preserved by Ibn Abi Usaybi'a, al-Farabi stated that he had studied logic, medicine and sociology with Yuhanna ibn Haylan up to and including Aristotle's Posterior Analytics, i.e., according to the order of the books studied in the curriculum, al-Farabi was claiming that he had studied Porphyry's Eisagoge and Aristotle's Categories, De Interpretatione, Prior and Posterior Analytics. His teacher, Yuhanna bin Haylan, was a Nestorian cleric. This period of study was probably in Baghdad, where al-Mas'udi records that Yuhanna died during the reign of al-Muqtadir (295-320/908-32). In his Appearance of Philosophy (Fī Ẓuhūr al-Falsafa), al-Farabi tells us:

Philosophy as an academic subject became widespread in the days of the Ptolemaic kings of the Greeks after the death of Aristotle in Alexandria until the end of the woman’s reign [i.e., Cleopatra’s]. The teaching of it continued unchanged in Alexandria after the death of Aristotle through the reign of thirteen kings ... Thus it went until the coming of Christianity. Then the teaching came to an end in Rome while it continued in Alexandria until the king of the Christians looked into the matter. The bishops assembled and took counsel together on which parts of [philosophy] teaching were to be left in place and which were to be discontinued. They formed the opinion that the books on logic were to be taught up to the end of the assertoric figures [Prior Analytics, I.7] but not what comes after it, since they thought that would harm Christianity. Teaching the rest [of the logical works] remained private until the coming of Islam when the teaching was transferred from Alexandria to Antioch. There it remained for a long time until only one teacher was left. Two men learned from him, and they left, taking the books with them. One of them was from Harran, the other from Merw. As for the man from Marw, two men learned from him..., Ibrahim al-Marwazi and Yuhanna ibn Haylan. [Al-Farabi then says he studied with Yuhanna ibn Haylan up to the end of the Posterior Analytics].

He was in Baghdad at least until the end of September 942, as recorded in notes in his Mabādeʾ ārāʾ ahl al-madīna al-fāżela. He finished the book in Damascus the following year (331), i.e., by September 943). He also lived and taught for some time in Aleppo. Al-Farabi later visited Egypt, finishing six sections summarizing the book Mabādeʾ, (Note: Once Farabi finished the Virtuous City and inserted the Chapter headings, later, somebody inquired him to include sections, summarizing the Chapters, and this he did in Cairo. These six Sections are referred to as Summery of the Virtuous City → Mahdi, Muhsin S. (1990). "Fārābī's Imperfect State". Journal of the American Oriental Society. CX (4): 691–726 (esp. pp. 720 ff.). doi:10.2307/602898. JSTOR 602898. S2CID 163394266..) in Egypt in 337/July 948 – June 949 when he returned to Syria, where he was supported by Sayf al-Dawla, the Hamdanid ruler. Al-Mas'udi, writing barely five years after the fact (955-6, the date of the composition of the Tanbīh), says that al-Farabi died in Damascus in Rajab 339 (between 14 December 950 and 12 January 951).

== Religious beliefs ==
Al-Farabi's religious affiliation within Islam is disputed by scholars. While some historians identify him as Sunni, some others assert he was Shia or influenced by Shia.

Fauzi Najjar argues that al-Farabi's political philosophy was influenced by Shiite sects. Giving a positive account, Nadia Maftouni describes Shi'ite aspects of al-Farabi's writings. As she put it, al-Farabi in his al-Millah, al-Siyasah al-Madaniyah, and Tahsil al-Sa’adah believes in a utopia governed by Prophet and his successors: the Imams. Henry Corbin also argues that, since al-Farabi accepted patronage of the Hamdanid dynasty, and resided in Hamdanid Syria for most of his life, that he should generally be viewed as being divorced from the Central Asian Sunni millieu, and closer to Levantine Shi'ism.

== Works and contributions ==
Al-Farabi made contributions to the fields of logic, mathematics, music, philosophy, psychology, and education.

=== Alchemy ===
Al-Farabi wrote The Necessity of the Art of the Elixir on alchemy. (Note: Epistle on the Necessity of the Art of Alchemy (Arabic: رسالة في وُجُوب صِنآعة الكيمياء, romanized: Risāla fī Wujūb ṣinā‘at al-kimiyā’) → Rudolph 2017, p. 571.) Al-Farabi lived during the time when alchemy was at its peak, with alchemists seeking to turn cheap metals into gold or silver whilst seeking the Philosopher's stone. Al-Farabi himself tried to prove that alchemy was a significant science and a necessity for societal advancement: he believed in the "signiﬁcant beneﬁt in revealing the essence of certain chemical processes and compounds, if it is guided by scientiﬁc principles and does not pretend to be impossible." However, al-Farabi diverged from the previous alchemist's way of thinking, claiming that there are no analogs of gold and silver:

There are common gold and silver that we all know about, no more gold and silver exists. If we ﬁnd any other gold, it will not look like the gold we see. We need some simple logic here. The ignorant person believes that gold and silver can make from ordinary stone. However, an educated person would never believe such a lie. According to Farabi, to better understand the craft of alchemy, it is necessary to study it completely, and ﬁrst of all better start from studying mineralogy. Before studying mineralogy, you need to study Philosophy. A comprehensive study of all aspects of philosophy reveals the true nature of things and leads to absolute wisdom. He believes that only a philosopher can achieve absolute wisdom.

Al-Farabi studies the treatises of Aristotle and other scientists and provided two new ideas for the time: firstly, al-Farabi said that gold, silver, and other precious metal were melt rather than burnt, and secondly, the difference between substances of the identical type is based on accidents, meaning any two different materials of the same kind differ in accidents and any of them can merge into each other. Al-Farabi therefore concluded that the views of prior alchemists were wrong.

=== Logic ===
Though he was mainly an Aristotelian logician, he included a number of non-Aristotelian elements in his works. He discussed the topics of future contingents, the number and relation of the categories, the relation between logic and grammar, and non-Aristotelian forms of inference. He is also credited with categorizing logic into two separate groups, the first being "idea" and the second being "proof".

Al-Farabi also considered the theories of conditional syllogisms and analogical inference, which were part of the Stoic tradition of logic rather than the Aristotelian. Another addition al-Farabi made to the Aristotelian tradition was his introduction of the concept of "poetic syllogism" in a commentary on Aristotle's Poetics.

=== Music ===
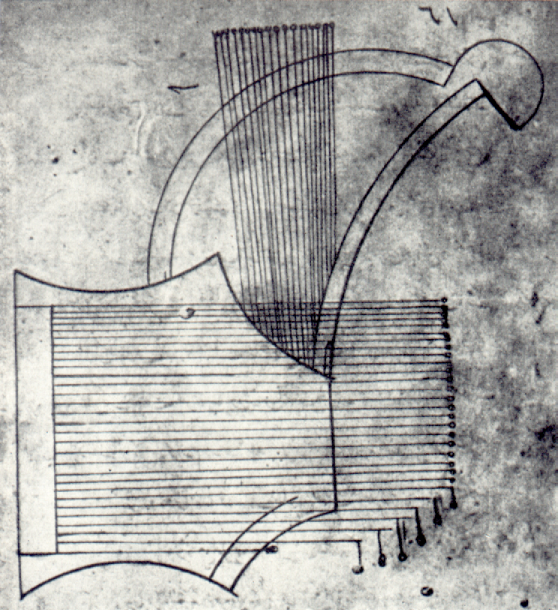
Drawing of a musical instrument, a shahrud, from al-Farabi's Kitab al-Musiqi al-Kabir

Al-Farabi wrote a book on music titled Kitab al-Musiqi al-Kabir (The Great Book of Music). In it, he presents philosophical principles about music, its cosmic qualities, and its influences, and discusses the therapeutic effects of music on the soul.

He moreover talks about its impact on speech, clarifying how actually to fit music to speech, i.e., poetry, in arrange to upgrade the meaning of a text. Al-Farabi determined that different kinds of music produce different effects on the soul. He details these effects across multiple chapters, ranging from music's origins itself to the effects of instruments played.

The Great Book of Music has been recognized as being of "utmost importance" for the Middle East, due its coverage of diverse aspects of musical arts, its description of the construction of maqams prevalent in al-Farabi's time, the various philosophical principles introduced regarding Islamic musical culture, and the cosmic qualities of music.

Al-Farabi notes that music borrows principles from mathematics, theorizing that music performance and the art of hearing were ideal judges for determining the validity of certain theoretical propositions. This applies even if, in some instances, the musical outcome contradicts more concrete mathematical calculations.

=== Philosophy ===
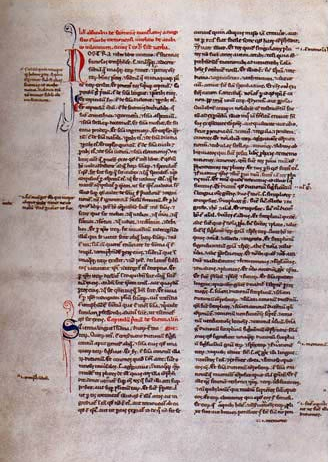
Gerard of Cremona's Latin translation of Kitab ihsa' al-'ulum ("Enumeration of the Sciences")

As a philosopher, al-Farabi was a founder of his own school of early Islamic philosophy known as "Farabism" or "Alfarabism", though it was later overshadowed by Avicennism. Al-Farabi's school of philosophy "breaks with the philosophy of Plato and Aristotle [... and ...] moves from metaphysics to methodology, a move that anticipates modernity", and "at the level of philosophy, Farabi unites theory and practice [... and] in the sphere of the political he liberates practice from theory". His Neoplatonic theology is also more than just metaphysics as rhetoric. In his attempt to think through the nature of a First Cause, Farabi discovers the limits of human knowledge". However, both the Greeks (Plato & Aristotle) and Al-Farabi share the common concern with truth in their philosophical approach. The difference is that Plato and Aristotle ground their metaphysical worldview with the understanding of human life as it related to ultimate philosophical truths, while al-Farabi pursuits the truth as the ultimate goal in itself. Al-Farabi's philosophy is a broader trend within Islamic philosophy, evident in the ontological and epistemological outlooks of the tradition.

Al-Farabi had great influence on science and philosophy for several centuries, and was widely considered second only to Aristotle in knowledge (alluded to by his title of the "Second Teacher"), in his time. His work, aimed at synthesis of philosophy and Sufism, paved the way for the work of Avicenna.

Al-Farabi also wrote a commentary on Aristotle's work, and one of his most notable works is Ara Ahl al-Madina al-Fadila. Al-Farabi argued that religion rendered truth through symbols and persuasion, and, like Plato, saw it as the duty of the philosopher to provide guidance to the state. He incorporated the Platonic view to create a theoretical model of an ideal state ruled by an abstract "Prophet-Imam" or "First Ruler." It is crucial to note that Al-Farabi never explicitly claimed in his philosophical writings that the historical figure of Muhammad was this perfect leader, nor did he ever state that the city of Medina was the ideal state. While traditional commentators often assume he was implicitly referring to Muhammad and Medina, scholars emphasize that his deliberate omission of these specific historical names was intended to establish a universal philosophical ideal, leaving it open to interpretation whether any historical figure actually met his strict philosophical criteria. In the absence of the Prophet-Imam, al-Farabi considered democracy as the closest to the ideal state, regarding the order of the Sunni Rashidun Caliphate as an example of such a republican order within early Muslim history. However, he also maintained that it was from democracy that imperfect states emerged, noting how the order of the early Islamic Caliphate of the Rashidun caliphs, which he viewed as republican, was later replaced by a form of government resembling a monarchy under the Umayyad and Abbasid dynasties.

=== Physics ===
Al-Farabi wrote a short treatise On Vacuum, where he thought about the nature of the existence of void. His final conclusion was that air's volume can expand to fill available space, and he suggested that the concept of perfect vacuum was incoherent.

=== Psychology ===
In his Opinions of the People of the Ideal City, al-Farabi expressed that a separated person may not accomplish all the idealizations by himself, without the help of other people. It is the intrinsic mien of each man to connect to another human being or to other men within the labor he has to perform. Consequently, to realize what he can of that flawlessness, each man must remain within the neighborhood of others and relate with them. In chapter 24 of aforementioned text—On the Cause of Dreams— he distinguished between dream interpretation and the nature and causes of dreams.

== Influences and transmission ==
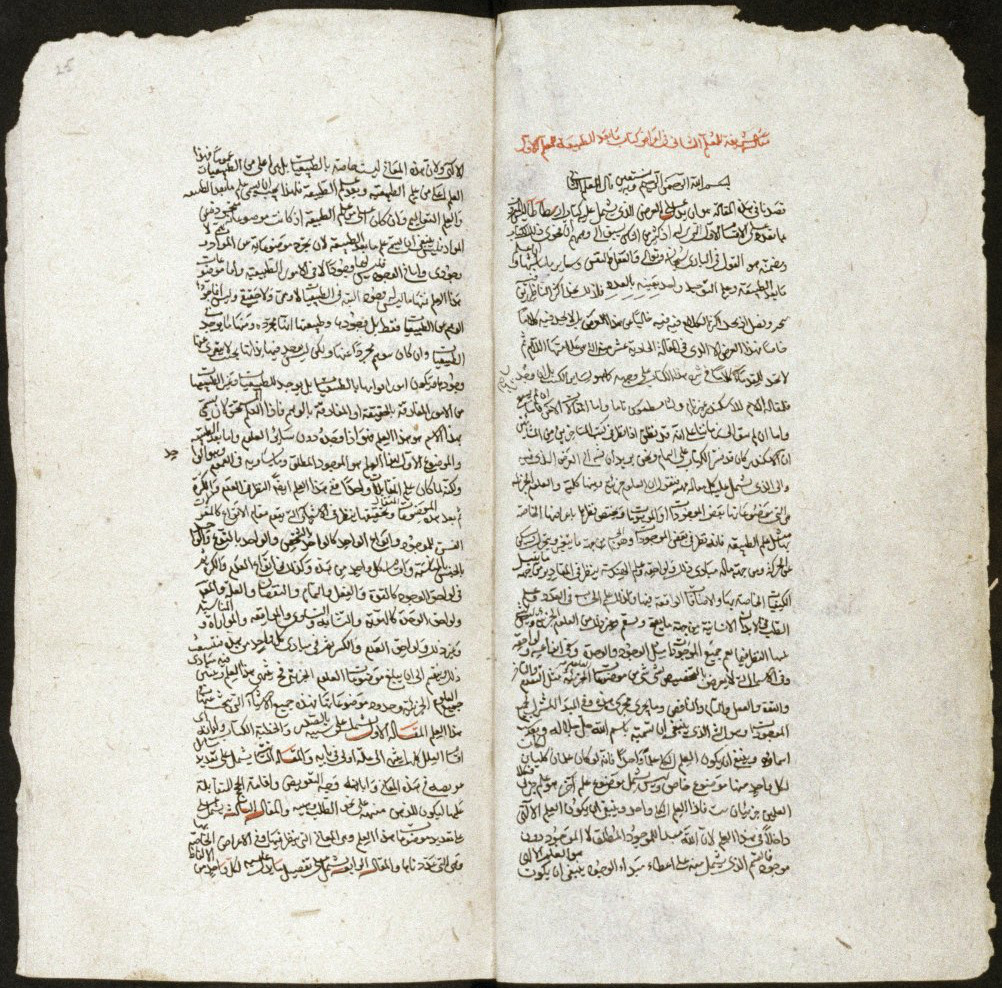
Pages from a 17th-century manuscript of al-Farabi's commentary on Aristotle's metaphysics

The main influence on al-Farabi's philosophy was the Aristotelian tradition of Alexandria. A prolific writer, he is credited with over one hundred works. Amongst these are a number of prolegomena to philosophy, commentaries on important Aristotelian works (such as the Nicomachean Ethics) as well as his own works. His ideas are marked by their coherency, despite drawing together of many different philosophical disciplines and traditions. Some other significant influences on his work were the planetary model of Ptolemy and elements of Neo-Platonism, particularly metaphysics and practical (or political) philosophy—which bears more resemblance to Plato's Republic than Aristotle's Politics.

Al-Farabi played an essential part in the handing down of Aristotle's thought to the Christian West during the Middle Ages, as appears in the translation of al-Farabi's Commentary and Short Treatise on Aristotle's de Interpretatione that F. W. Zimmermann published in 1981. Al-Farabi had a great influence on Maimonides, the most important Jewish thinker of the Middle Ages. Maimonides wrote the celebrated Treatise on Logic in Arabic. The work treats of the essentials of Aristotelian logic in the light of comments made by Avicenna and al-Farabi; Rémi Brague emphasises the fact that al-Farabi is the only philosopher mentioned by name within the text.

Al-Farabi, as well as Avicenna and Averroes, have been recognized as Peripatetics (al-Mashsha’iyun) or rationalists (Estedlaliun) among Muslims. However, he tried to gather together the ideas of Plato and Aristotle in his book Harmonization of the Opinion of the Two Sage. (Note: A common abbreviated title of the book (Arabic: الجَمْعُ بَينَ رَأْيَيِ الْحَكيمَيْن, romanized: al-Jam‘ bayna ra’yay al-ḥakīmayn). Its full title is (Arabic: الجَمْعُ بَينَ رَأْيَيِ الْحَكيمَيْن‌ أفلآطوُن الإِلاهي وأرسطوُطآليس, romanized: al-Jam‘ bayna ra’yay al-ḥakīmayn aflāṭūn al-ilāhī wa-arisṭūṭālīs), Harmonization of the Opinions of the Two Sages the Divine Plato and Aristotle. Attribution of this text to Farabi is currently hotly debated → Druart 2021, § 7.)

According to Reisman, his work was singularly directed towards the goal of simultaneously reviving and reinventing the Alexandrian philosophical tradition, to which his Christian teacher, Yuhanna ibn Haylan belonged. His success should be measured by the honorific title of the "Second Master" of philosophy, Aristotle being the first, by which he was known. Reisman also says that he does not make any reference to the ideas of either al-Kindi or his contemporary, Rhazes, which clearly indicates that he did not consider their approach to philosophy as a correct or viable one.

== Thought ==
=== Metaphysics and cosmology ===
In contrast to al-Kindi, who considered the subject of metaphysics to be God, al-Farabi believed that it was concerned primarily with being qua being (that is, being in and of itself), and this is related to God only to the extent that God is a principle of absolute being. Al-Kindi's view was, however, a common misconception regarding Greek philosophy amongst Muslim intellectuals at the time, and it was for this reason that Avicenna remarked that he did not understand Aristotle's Metaphysics properly until he had read a prolegomenon written by al-Farabi.

Al-Farabi's cosmology is essentially based upon three pillars: Aristotelian metaphysics of causation, highly developed Plotinian emanational cosmology and the Ptolemaic astronomy. In his model, the universe is viewed as a number of concentric circles; the outermost sphere or "first heaven", the sphere of fixed stars, Saturn, Jupiter, Mars, the Sun, Venus, Mercury and finally, the Moon. At the centre of these concentric circles is the sub-lunar realm which contains the material world. Each of these circles represent the domain of the secondary intelligences (symbolized by the celestial bodies themselves), which act as causal intermediaries between the First Cause (in this case, God) and the material world. Furthermore these are said to have emanated from God, who is both their formal and efficient cause.

The process of emanation begins (metaphysically, not temporally) with the First Cause, whose principal activity is self-contemplation. And it is this intellectual activity that underlies its role in the creation of the universe. The First Cause, by thinking of itself, "overflows" and the incorporeal entity of the second intellect "emanates" from it. Like its predecessor, the second intellect also thinks about itself, and thereby brings its celestial sphere (in this case, the sphere of fixed stars) into being, but in addition to this it must also contemplate upon the First Cause, and this causes the "emanation" of the next intellect. The cascade of emanation continues until it reaches the tenth intellect, beneath which is the material world. And as each intellect must contemplate both itself and an increasing number of predecessors, each succeeding level of existence becomes more and more complex. This process is based upon necessity as opposed to will. In other words, God does not have a choice whether or not to create the universe, but by virtue of His own existence, He causes it to be. This view also suggests that the universe is eternal, and both of these points were criticized by al-Ghazzali in his attack on the philosophers.

In his discussion of the First Cause (or God), al-Farabi relies heavily on negative theology. He says that it cannot be known by intellectual means, such as dialectical division or definition, because the terms used in these processes to define a thing constitute its substance. Therefore if one was to define the First Cause, each of the terms used would actually constitute a part of its substance and therefore behave as a cause for its existence, which is impossible as the First Cause is uncaused; it exists without being caused. Equally, he says it cannot be known according to genus and differentia, as its substance and existence are different from all others, and therefore it has no category to which it belongs. If this were the case, then it would not be the First Cause, because something would be prior in existence to it, which is also impossible. This would suggest that the more philosophically simple a thing is, the more perfect it is. And based on this observation, Reisman says it is possible to see the entire hierarchy of al-Farabi's cosmology according to classification into genus and species. Each succeeding level in this structure has as its principal qualities multiplicity and deficiency, and it is this ever-increasing complexity that typifies the material world.

=== Epistemology and eschatology ===
Human beings are unique in al-Farabi's vision of the universe because they stand between two worlds: the "higher", immaterial world of the celestial intellects and universal intelligibles, and the "lower", material world of generation and decay; they inhabit a physical body, and so belong to the "lower" world, but they also have a rational capacity, which connects them to the "higher" realm. Each level of existence in al-Farabi's cosmology is characterized by its movement towards perfection, which is to become like the First Cause, i.e. a perfect intellect. Human perfection (or "happiness"), then, is equated with constant intellection and contemplation.

Al-Farabi divides intellect into four categories: potential, actual, acquired and the Agent. The first three are the different states of the human intellect and the fourth is the Tenth Intellect (the moon) in his emanational cosmology. The potential intellect represents the capacity to think, which is shared by all human beings, and the actual intellect is an intellect engaged in the act of thinking. By thinking, al-Farabi means abstracting universal intelligibles from the sensory forms of objects which have been apprehended and retained in the individual's imagination.

This motion from potentiality to actuality requires the Agent Intellect to act upon the retained sensory forms; just as the Sun illuminates the physical world to allow us to see, the Agent Intellect illuminates the world of intelligibles to allow us to think. This illumination removes all accident (such as time, place, quality) and physicality from them, converting them into primary intelligibles, which are logical principles such as "the whole is greater than the part". The human intellect, by its act of intellection, passes from potentiality to actuality, and as it gradually comprehends these intelligibles, it is identified with them (as according to Aristotle, by knowing something, the intellect becomes like it). Because the Agent Intellect knows all of the intelligibles, this means that when the human intellect knows all of them, it becomes associated with the Agent Intellect's perfection and is known as the acquired Intellect.

While this process seems mechanical, leaving little room for human choice or volition, Reisman says that al-Farabi is committed to human voluntarism. This takes place when man, based on the knowledge he has acquired, decides whether to direct himself towards virtuous or unvirtuous activities, and thereby decides whether or not to seek true happiness. And it is by choosing what is ethical and contemplating about what constitutes the nature of ethics, that the actual intellect can become "like" the active intellect, thereby attaining perfection. It is only by this process that a human soul may survive death, and live on in the afterlife.

According to al-Farabi, the afterlife is not the personal experience commonly conceived of by religious traditions such as Islam and Christianity. Any individual or distinguishing features of the soul are annihilated after the death of the body; only the rational faculty survives (and then, only if it has attained perfection), which becomes one with all other rational souls within the agent intellect and enters a realm of pure intelligence. Henry Corbin compares this eschatology with that of the Ismaili shias, for whom this process initiated the next grand cycle of the universe. However, Deborah Black mentions we have cause to be skeptical as to whether this was the mature and developed view of al-Farabi, as later thinkers such as Ibn Tufayl, Averroes and Avempace would assert that he repudiated this view in his commentary on the Nicomachean Ethics, which has been lost to modern experts.

=== Psychology, the soul and prophetic knowledge ===
In his treatment of the human soul, al-Farabi draws on a basic Aristotelian outline, which is informed by the commentaries of later Greek thinkers. He says it is composed of four faculties: The appetitive (the desire for, or aversion to an object of sense), the sensitive (the perception by the senses of corporeal substances), the imaginative (the faculty which retains images of sensible objects after they have been perceived, and then separates and combines them for a number of ends), and the rational, which is the faculty of intellection. It is the last of these which is unique to human beings and distinguishes them from plants and animals. It is also the only part of the soul to survive the death of the body. Noticeably absent from these scheme are internal senses, such as common sense, which would be discussed by later philosophers such as Avicenna and Averroes.

Special attention must be given to al-Farabi's treatment of the soul's imaginative faculty, which is essential to his interpretation of prophethood and prophetic knowledge. In addition to its ability to retain and manipulate sensible images of objects, he gives the imagination the function of imitation. By this he means the capacity to represent an object with an image other than its own. In other words, to imitate "x" is to imagine "x" by associating it with sensible qualities that do not describe its own appearance. This extends the representative ability of the imagination beyond sensible forms and to include temperaments, emotions, desires and even immaterial intelligibles or abstract universals, as happens when, for example, one associates "evil" with "darkness". The Prophet, in addition to his own intellectual capacity, has a very strong imaginative faculty, which allows him to receive an overflow of intelligibles from the agent intellect (the tenth intellect in the emanational cosmology). These intelligibles are then associated with symbols and images, which allow him to communicate abstract truths in a way that can be understood by ordinary people. Therefore what makes prophetic knowledge unique is not its content, which is also accessible to philosophers through demonstration and intellection, but rather the form that it is given by the prophet's imagination.

=== Practical philosophy (ethics and politics) ===
The practical application of philosophy was a major concern expressed by al-Farabi in many of his works, and while the majority of his philosophical output has been influenced by Aristotelian thought, his practical philosophy was unmistakably based on that of Plato. In a similar manner to Plato's Republic, al-Farabi emphasized that philosophy was both a theoretical and practical discipline; labeling those philosophers who do not apply their erudition to practical pursuits as "futile philosophers". The ideal society, he wrote, is one directed towards the realization of "true happiness" (which can be taken to mean philosophical enlightenment) and as such, the ideal philosopher must hone all the necessary arts of rhetoric and poetics to communicate abstract truths to the ordinary people, as well as having achieved enlightenment himself. Al-Farabi compared the philosopher's role in relation to society with a physician in relation to the body; the body's health is affected by the "balance of its humours" just as the city is determined by the moral habits of its people. The philosopher's duty, he wrote, was to establish a "virtuous" society by healing the souls of the people, establishing justice and guiding them towards "true happiness".

Of course, al-Farabi realized that such a society was rare and required a very specific set of historical circumstances to be realized, which means very few societies could ever attain this goal. He divided those "vicious" societies, which have fallen short of the ideal "virtuous" society, into three categories: ignorant, wicked and errant. Ignorant societies have, for whatever reason, failed to comprehend the purpose of human existence, and have supplanted the pursuit of happiness for another (inferior) goal, whether this be wealth, sensual gratification or power. Al-Farabi mentions "weeds" in the virtuous society: those people who try to undermine its progress towards the true human end. The best known Arabic source for al-Farabi's political philosophy is his work titled, Ara Ahl al-Madina al-fadila.

Although some consider al-Farabi to be a political idealist, whether or not al-Farabi actually intended to outline a political programme in his writings remains a matter of dispute amongst academics. Henry Corbin, who considers al-Farabi to be a crypto-Shi'ite, says that his ideas should be understood as a "prophetic philosophy" instead of being interpreted politically. On the other hand, Charles Butterworth contends that nowhere in his work does al-Farabi speak of a prophet-legislator or revelation (even the word philosophy is scarcely mentioned), and the main discussion that takes place concerns the positions of "king" and "statesmen". Occupying a middle position is David Reisman, who, like Corbin, believes that al-Farabi did not want to expound a political doctrine (although he does not go so far to attribute it to Islamic Gnosticism either). He argues that al-Farabi was using different types of society as examples, in the context of an ethical discussion, to show what effect correct or incorrect thinking could have. Lastly, Joshua Parens argues that al-Farabi was slyly asserting that a pan-Islamic society could not be made, by using reason to show how many conditions (such as moral and deliberative virtue) would have to be met, thus leading the reader to conclude that humans are not fit for such a society. Some other authors such as Mykhaylo Yakubovych argue that for al-Farabi, religion (milla) and philosophy (falsafa) constituted the same praxeological value (i.e. basis for amal al-fadhil—"virtuous deed"), while its epistemological level (ilm—"knowledge") was different.

=== Modern Western translations ===
English

- Fusul al-Madani: Aphorisms of the Statesman Cambridge: Cambridge University Press, 1961.
- Short Commentary on Aristotle's Prior Analytics, Pittsburgh: University of Pittsburgh Press, 1963.
- Al-Farabi's Commentary and Short Treatise on Aristotle's De interpretatione, Oxford: Oxford University Press, 1981.
- Al-Farabi on the Perfect State, Oxford: Clarendon Press, 1985.
- Alfarabi's Philosophy of Plato and Aristotle, translated and with an introduction by Muhsin Mahdi, Ithaca: Cornell University Press, 2001.
- Alfarabi, The Political Writings. Selected Aphorisms and Other Texts, Ithaca: Cornell University Press, 2001.
- "Al-Farabi's Long Commentary on Aristotle's Categoriae in Hebrew and Arabic", In Studies in Arabic and Islamic Culture, Vol. II, edited by Abrahamov, Binyamin. Ramat: Bar-Ilan University Press, 2006.
- Alfarabi, The Political Writings, Volume II. "Political Regime" and "Summary of Plato's Laws, Ithaca: Cornell University Press, 2015.
- Book of Letters (Kitab Al-Huruf), English Translation by Charles E. Butterworth with Introduction, Interpretive Essay and Annotations, plus Muhsin Mahdi's revised edition of the Arabic text. Foreword by Hamsa Yusuf. Berkeley (CA), Zaytouna College 2024.
- Texts translated by D. M. Dunlop:
  - "The Existence and Definition of Philosophy. From an Arabic text ascribed to al-Farabi", Iraq, 1951, pp. 76–93).
  - "Al-Farabi's Aphorisms of the Statesman", Iraq, 1952, pp. 93–117.
  - "Al-Farabi's Introductory Sections on Logic", The Islamic Quarterly, 1955, pp. 264–282.
  - "Al-Farabi's Eisagoge", The Islamic Quarterly, 1956, pp. 117–138.
  - "Al-Farabi's Introductory Risalah on Logic", The Islamic Quarterly, 1956, pp. 224–235.
  - "Al-Farabi's Paraphrase of the Categories of Aristotle [Part 1]", The Islamic Quarterly, 1957, pp. 168–197.
  - "Al-Farabi's Paraphrase of the Categories of Aristotle [Part 2]", The Islamic Quarterly, 1959, pp. 21–54.

French

- Idées des habitants de la cité vertueuse. Translated by Karam, J. Chlala, A. Jaussen. 1949.
- Traité des opinions des habitants de la cité idéale. Translated by Tahani Sabri. Paris: J. Vrin, 1990.
- Le Livre du régime politique, introduction, traduction et commentaire de Philippe Vallat, Paris: Les Belles Lettres, 2012.

Spanish

- Catálogo De Las Ciencias, Madrid: Imp. de Estanislao Maestre, 1932.
- La ciudad ideal. Translated by Manuel Alonso. Madrid: Tecnos, 1995.
- "Al-Farabi: Epístola sobre los sentidos del término intelecto", Revista Española de filosofía medieval, 2002, pp. 215–223.
- El camino de la felicidad, trad. R. Ramón Guerrero, Madrid: Ed. Trotta, 2002
- Obras filosóficas y políticas, trad. R. Ramón Guerrero, Madrid: Ed. Trotta, 2008.
- Las filosofías de Platón y Aristóteles. Con un Apéndice: Sumario de las Leyes de Platón. Prólogo y Tratado primero, traducción, introducción y notas de Rafael Ramón Guerrero, Madrid, Ápeiron Ediciones, 2017.

Portuguese

- A cidade excelente. Translated by Miguel Attie Filho. São Paulo: Attie, 2019.

German

- Der Musterstaat. Translated by Friedrich Dieterici. Leiden: E. J. Brill, 1895.

== Legacy ==
- A large Kazakh university KazNU, bears his name. There is also an Al-Farabi Library on the university grounds.
- Shymkent Pedagogical Institute of Culture named after al-Farabi (1967–1996).
- In many cities of Kazakhstan there are streets named after him.
- Monuments have been erected in the cities of Alma-Ata, Shymkent and Turkestan.
- In 1975, the 1100th anniversary of al-Farabi's birth was celebrated on a large international scale in Moscow, Alma-Ata and Baghdad.
- The main-belt asteroid 7057 Al-Fārābī was named in his honor.
- In November 2021, a monument to al-Farabi was unveiled in Astana (then Nur-Sultan), Kazakhstan.

== See also ==
- List of modern-day Muslim scholars of Islam
- List of Muslim scientists
- Tenth Intellect in Ismailism

== Citations ==
=== Bibliography ===
- Adamson, Peter S. (2016). Philosophy in The Islamic World: a history of philosophy without any gaps. Volume III. New York: Oxford University Press. pp. 63–76. ISBN 978-0-19-957749-1.
- Black, D.L. (1996). "Fārābī". In Seyyed Hossein Nasr; Oliver Leaman (eds.). History of Islamic Philosophy. Routledge History of World Philosophies. Volume I. London & New York: Routledge. pp. 178–197. ISBN 978-0-415-05667-0.
- Black, D.L. (2005). "Psychology: Soul and Intellect". In Peter S. Adamson; Richard C.Taylor (eds.). The Cambridge Companion to Arabic Philosophy. Cambridge Companions to Philosophy. Cambridge: Cambridge University Press. pp. 308–326. doi:10.1017/CCOL0521817439.015. ISBN 0-521-81743-9.
- Butterworth, C.E. (2015). "Alfarabi (870–950)". In Michael T. Gibbons (ed.). The Encyclopedia of Political Thought. Hoboken, New Jersey: John Wiley & Sons, Ltd. ISBN 978-1-405-19129-6.
- Butterworth, C.E. (2005). "Ethical and Political Philosophy". In Peter S. Adamson; Richard C.Taylor (eds.). The Cambridge Companion to Arabic Philosophy. Cambridge Companions to Philosophy. Cambridge: Cambridge University Press. pp. 266–286. doi:10.1017/CCOL0521817439.013. ISBN 0-521-81743-9.
- Corbin, Henry (1993). History of Islamic Philosophy. Translated by Liadain Sherrard, with the assistance of Philip Sherrard. London: Kegan Paul International, in association with the Islamic Publications Ltd. ISBN 978-0-7103-0416-2.
- Daiber, Hans (1996). "Political Philosophy". In Seyyed Hossein Nasr; Oliver Leaman (eds.). History of Islamic Philosophy. History of World Philosophies. Volume I. London & New York: Routledge. pp. 841–885. ISBN 978-0-415-05667-0.
- Dhanani, Alnoor (2007). "Fārābī: Abū Naṣr". In Hockey, Thomas (ed.). The Biographical Encyclopedia of Astronomers. New York: Springer. pp. 356–357. ISBN 978-0-387-31022-0. (PDF version)
- Druart, Thérèse-Anne (December 21, 2021). "Farabi". In Zalta, Edward N. (ed.). The Stanford Encyclopedia of Philosophy. Stanford University.
- Fakhry, M. (1994). Ethical Theories in Islam. Islamic Philosophy, Theology and Science. Texts and Studies. Volume VIII (2nd Expanded ed.). Leiden: Brill. ISBN 9004-10107-1. ISSN 0169-8729.
- Fakhry, M. (2002). Fārābī, Founder of Islamic Neoplatonism: His Life, Works, and Influence. Great Islamic Thinkers. Oxford: Oneworld. ISBN 1-85168-302-X.
- Galston, Miriam (1990). Politics and Excellence: The Political Philosophy of Alfarabi. Princeton: Princeton University Press. ISBN 0-691-07808-4.
- Gutas, D. (January 24, 2012a). Ehsan Yarshater (ed.). "Fārābī i. Biography". Encyclopædia Iranica. Encyclopædia Iranica Foundation.
- Gutas, D. (January 24, 2012b). Ehsan Yarshater (ed.). "Fārābī iv. Fārābī and Greek Philosophy". Encyclopædia Iranica. Encyclopædia Iranica Foundation.
- Haque, Amber (2004). "Psychology from Islamic Perspective: Contributions of Early Muslim Scholars and Challenges to Contemporary Muslim Psychologists". Journal of Religion and Health. XLIII (4): 357–377. doi:10.1007/s10943-004-4302-z. JSTOR 27512819. S2CID 38740431.
- López-Farjeat, Luis Xavier (June 21, 2020). "Farabi's Psychology and Epistemology". In Zalta, Edward N. (ed.). The Stanford Encyclopedia of Philosophy. Stanford University.
- Madkour, Ibrahim (1963–1966). "Fārābī" ( (PDF)). In Sharif, Mian M. (ed.). A History of Muslim Philosophy. With short accounts of other-disciplines and the modern renaissance in Muslim lands. Vol. I. Wiesbaden: Otto Harrassowitz. pp. 450–468. Archived from the original on 2007-03-25.
- McGinnis, Jon (March 21, 2022). "Arabic and Islamic Natural Philosophy and Natural Science". In Zalta, Edward N. (ed.). The Stanford Encyclopedia of Philosophy. Stanford University.
- Mahdi, M.S.; Wright, Owen (1970–1980). "Fārābī, Abū Naṣr". In Gillispie, Charles C. (ed.). Dictionary of Scientific Biography. Vol. IV. New York: Charles Scribner's Sons. pp. 523a–526b. ISBN 0-684-16962-2.
- Mahdi, M.S. (January 1, 2000). Ehsan Yarshater (ed.). "Fārābī vi. Political Philosophy". Encyclopædia Iranica. Encyclopædia Iranica Foundation.
- Mahdi, M.S. (2010) [2001]. Alfarabi and the Foundation of Islamic Political Philosophy: Essays in Interpretation. With a Foreword by C.E. Butterworth. Chicago: The University of Chicago Press. ISBN 978-0-226-50186-4.
- Netton, I.R. (1994). Allāh Transcendent: Studies in the Structure and Semiotics of Islamic Philosophy, Theology and Cosmology. London & New York: Routledge. pp. 99–148 (Chapter III: Fārābī The Search for Order). ISBN 0-7007-0287-3.
- Netton, I.R. (1998). Edward Craig (ed.). "Farabi, Abu Nasr (c.870–950)". Routledge Encyclopedia of Philosophy. Taylor and Francis.
- Netton, I.R. (1992). Fārābī and His School. Arabic Thought and Culture. London & New York: Routledge. ISBN 0-415-03594-5.
- Reisman, David C. (2005). "Fārābī and the Philosophical Curriculum". In Peter S. Adamson; Richard C.Taylor (eds.). The Cambridge Companion to Arabic Philosophy. Cambridge Companions to Philosophy. Cambridge: Cambridge University Press. pp. 52–71. doi:10.1017/CCOL0521817439.004. ISBN 0-521-81743-9.
- Rudolph, Ulrich (2017). "Chapter XIII: Abū Naṣr Fārābī". In Ulrich Rudolph; Rotraud Hansberger; Peter S. Adamson (eds.). Philosophy in the Islamic World. Volume I: 8th—10th Centuries. Handbook of Oriental Studies. Section 1 The Near and Middle East. Volume: 115/1. Translated by Rotraud Hansberger. Leiden: Brill. pp. 526–654. doi:10.1163/9789004492547_012. ISBN 978-90-04-32316-2. ISSN 0169-9423.
- Sawa, George D. (January 24, 2012). Ehsan Yarshater (ed.). "Fārābī v. Music". Encyclopædia Iranica. Encyclopædia Iranica Foundation.
- Streetman, W. Craig (2014). "Fārābī". In İbrahim Kalın (ed.). The Oxford Encyclopedia of Philosophy, Science, and Technology in Islam. Vol. I. New York: Oxford University Press. pp. 231a–235a. ISBN 978-0-19-981257-8.
- Touma, H.H. (1996). The Music of the Arabs. New expanded edition. Translated by Laurie Schwartz. Portland, Oregon: Amadeus Press. ISBN 0-931340-88-8.
- Vallat, Philippe (2020). "Al-Fārābī, Abū Naṣr". In Henrik Lagerlund (ed.). Encyclopedia of Medieval Philosophy: Philosophy between 500 and 1500 (2nd ed.). New York: Springer. pp. 521a–559a. doi:10.1007/978-94-024-1665-7_165. ISBN 978-94-024-1663-3. S2CID 226604560.
- Weber, Michael C. (2017) [2006]. "Farabi". In Thomas F. Glick; Steven J. Livesey; Faith Wallis (eds.). Medieval Science, Technology and Medicine, An Encyclopedia. Routledge Revivals. London & New York: Routledge. pp. 169a–172a. ISBN 978-1-138-05670-1.
- Zonta, Mauro (2020). "Al-Fārābī, Latin Translations of". In Henrik Lagerlund (ed.). Encyclopedia of Medieval Philosophy: Philosophy between 500 and 1500 (2nd ed.). New York: Springer. pp. 559b–562a. doi:10.1007/978-94-024-1665-7_166. ISBN 978-94-024-1663-3. S2CID 242530993.
