= Platonism in Islamic philosophy =

Medieval Islamic philosophy was steeped in both Aristotelianism and Neoplatonism from its ninth-century beginnings with al-Kindi, but the influence of Neoplatonism becomes more clearly visible in the tenth and eleventh centuries with Al-Farabi and Avicenna. Al-Farabi expanded on Plato's concept of an ideal city ruled by philosopher-kings to develop a political philosophy that could accommodate the religious and cultural diversity central to Islamic nations. On the other hand, both al-Ghazali and Ibn Rushd vigorously opposed Neoplatonic views.

The characteristic of Neoplatonic thought in Islamic theology is that of emanation, linking God's transcendence with the corporeal reality of his creation. Islamic Neoplatonism was introduced by Al-Farabi, although Avicenna proved to have the greater influence. Both authors present a complex scheme of emanation.

Islamic Neoplatonism was allowed to flourish in the tenth to early eleventh century, but there was a strong reaction against it in the later eleventh century, especially from Al-Ghazali, who represents Islamic theology's "most biting attack on philosophy" at the time, and the severest reaction to Neoplatonism in particular (Netton 1998). Al-Ghazali's criticism evoked a counter-reaction by Ibn Rushd, who wrote a "systematic rebuttal of al-Ghazali's critique of Greco-Arab philosophy". While Ibn Rushd is trying to defend the possibility of philosophical thought as non-heretical, he does at the same time himself reject the theses of the Neoplatonist philosophers.

After the death of Ibn Rushd in 1198, the debate on Neoplatonism in Islam mostly comes to an end, and survival of Neoplatonic thought within Islam was mostly limited to Ismailism.
