= Joseph ben Judah ibn Aknin =

- Arabic: يوسف ابن عقنين; Hebrew: יוסף בן יהודה אבן עקנין
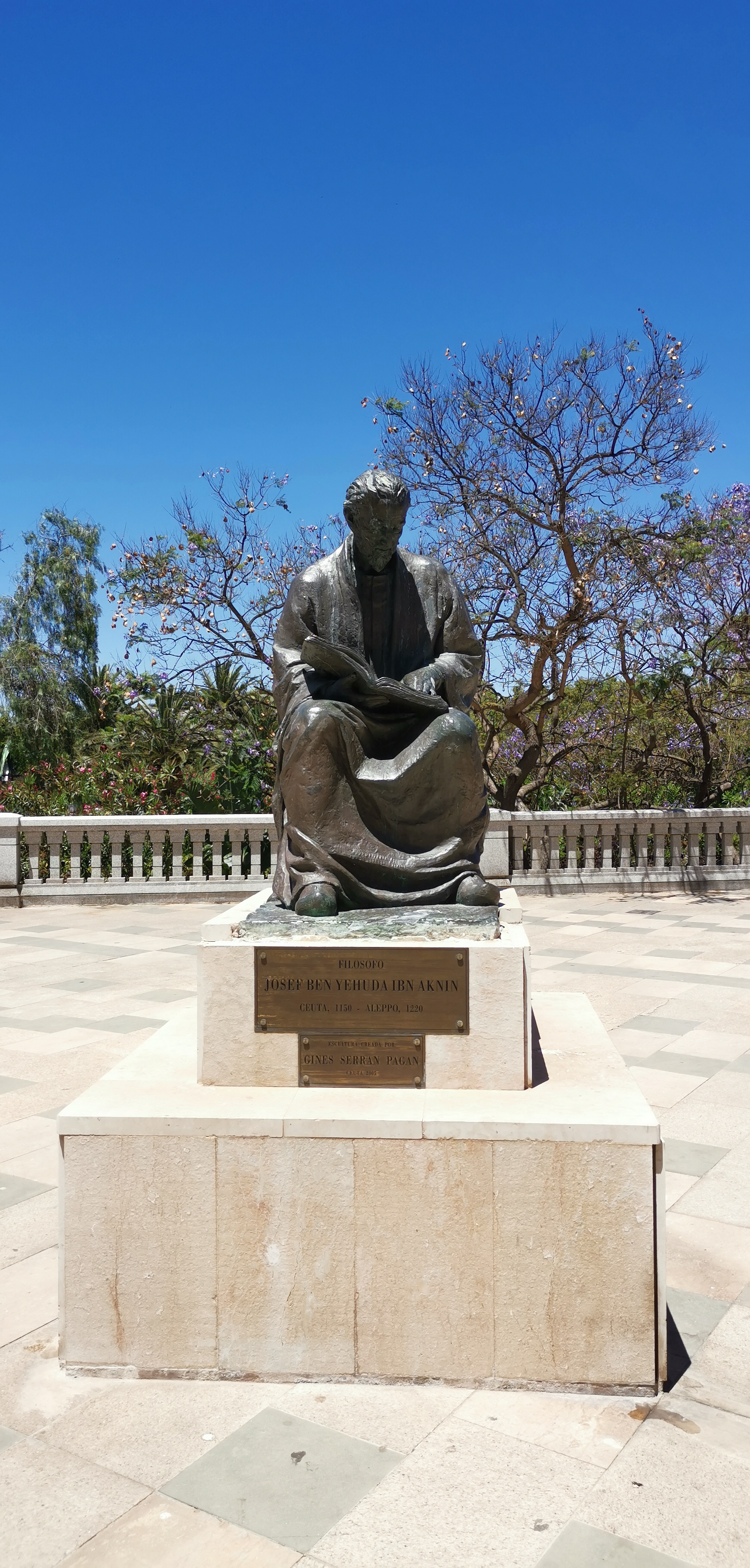
- Statue in Ceuta

Joseph ben Judah ibn Aknin (Arabic: يوسف ابن عقنين, Hebrew: יוסף בן יהודה אבן עקנין; c. 1150 – c. 1220) was a Sephardic Jewish writer of numerous treatises, mostly on the Mishnah and the Talmud. He was born in Barcelona, but settled in Fes, where by his own admission he lived as a crypto-Jew. Though a native of Spain, his family had originated in North Africa. He was a student of Maimonides, and the two had a very close relationship, especially concerning their private interest in the attainment of prophecy by use of esoteric knowledge and practices. Maimonides referred to him as "son" and the "portion from all my labor".

The Guide to the Perplexed was written by Maimonides primarily for his benefit, after an argument the two had over teachings on the prophetic perfections that Maimonides had been reluctant to divulge. Each chapter was mailed to Ibn Aknin by Maimonides, with the writing over time indicating a softening of his attitude towards his student. Eventually he decided to teach the secrets that had caused their fallout, writing the Chapters Concerning Felicity. This text was particularly out of character for Maimonides, who repeatedly counseled secrecy and privacy on matters of the esoteric and revelatory. It was clearly written, like the rest of the Guide, for Aknin- his disciple for whom "love overcame inhibition".

In his time Ibn Aknin was indeed considered a prophet by a few of his personal acquaintances, including R. Judah al-Harizi (who may have also considered Maimonides to be a prophet). During his time in Morocco, Ibn Aknin also studied with Muslims interested in the esoteric.

== Works ==
In addition to an introduction to the Talmud in Arabic (Hebrew translation at Mevo ha-Talmud), and a treatise on Talmudic weights and measures, his surviving works include:

- Sefer ha Musar ("Book of Morality")

A commentary on the Pirkei Avot similar to that of Maimonides.

- Tibb al-Nufūs al-Salīma wa-Mu ʿālajat al-Nufūs al-Alīma (طب النفوس السليمة ومعالجة النفوس الأليمة, "The Hygiene of Healthy Souls and the Therapy of Ailing Souls")

A book on psychology, with a chapters on friendship, speech and silence, keeping a secret, lying, food and drink, asceticism, education, the needs and destiny of the soul, persecutions and the proper response to them, and repentance. The chapter on education argues that the study of logic and science should not be undertaken before the age of thirty, and only after a solid traditional education so that religious convictions should not be affected by philosophical doubts.

- Inkishāf al-asrar ważuhūr al-anwār (انكشاف الأسرار وظهور الأنوار, "The Divulgence of Mysteries and the Appearance of Lights")

A commentary on the Song of Songs, treating each verse at three levels: at the literal level, citing contemporary grammarians to explain every word on the scroll; at a rabbinical level, based on midrashic texts, symbolising the people of Israel's relationship with God; and at an allegorical level, describing the soul trying to unite itself with the intellect, supported by Jewish and Arab poets, and the philosophy of Al-Farabi and Avicenna.

- Risālat al-ibānah fi uṣūl al-diyānah (رسالة الإبانة في أصول الديانة "Clarification of the Fundamentals of Faith") A book no longer in existence that discussed a man's freedom.
- A Hebrew translation of Al-Farabi's Kitab al-Musiqa al-Kabir (Great Book of Music)

Works which have been lost include Hukkim u-Mishpatim (a compendium of Jewish law), and a theological work Risalat al-Ibana fi Uṣul al-Diyana ("A Religious Clarification of Religious Fundamentals").

Ibn Aknin is known to have known Maimonides in North Africa, and draws on many of the same sources, sharing a similar outlook. But he is not the Joseph ben Judah to whom the Guide is addressed.
