= Al-Kindi =

Muslim Arab philosopher, mathematician and physician (c. 801–873)

al-Kindi
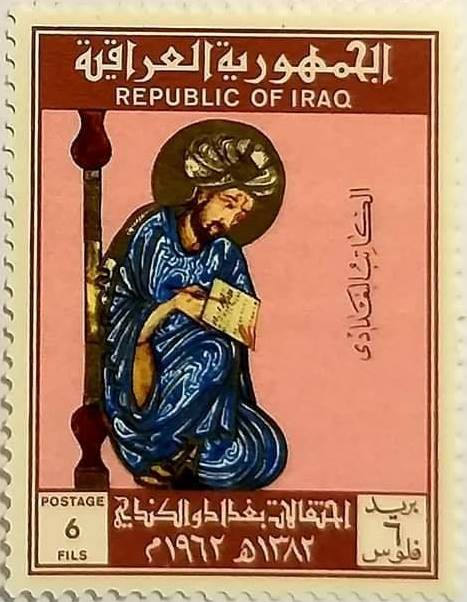
- al-Kindi on Iraqi stamp from 1962
- Born: c. 801 CE (c. 186 AH ) Kufa, Abbasid Caliphate
- Died: c. 873 CE (c. 258 AH) (aged approximately 72); Baghdad, Abbasid Caliphate

Philosophical work
- Era: Islamic Golden Age
- Region: Islamic philosophy
- School: Aristotelianism
- Main interests: Philosophy, Islamic theology (kalam), logic, ethics, mathematics, cryptography, physics, chemistry, psychology, pharmacology, medicine, metaphysics, cosmology, astrology, music theory
- Notable works: Manuscript on Deciphering Cryptographic Messages, Epistle on Informative Parts on Music, De radiis, De aspectibus

Religious life
- Religion: Islam
- Denomination: Mu'tazila

Abū Yūsuf Yaʻqūb ibn ʼIsḥāq aṣ-Ṣabbāḥ al-Kindī (/ælˈkɪndi/; Arabic: أبو يوسف يعقوب بن إسحاق الصبّاح الكندي; Latin: Alkindus; c. 801–873 AD) was a Mesopotamian Arab polymath who was active as a philosopher, mathematician, physician, and music theorist. Al-Kindi was the first of the Islamic peripatetic philosophers, and is hailed as the "father of Arab philosophy".

Al-Kindi was born in Kufa and educated in Baghdad. He became a prominent figure in the House of Wisdom (Bayt al-Hikma), an institute of translation and learning patronized by the Abbasid caliphs, in Baghdad, and a number of Abbasid caliphs appointed him to oversee the translation of Greek scientific and philosophical texts into the Arabic language. This contact with "the philosophy of the ancients" (as Hellenistic philosophy was often referred to by Muslim scholars) had a profound effect on him, as he synthesized, adapted and promoted Hellenistic and Peripatetic philosophy in the Muslim world. He subsequently wrote hundreds of original treatises of his own on a range of subjects, from metaphysics, ethics, logic and psychology, to medicine, pharmacology, mathematics, astronomy, astrology and optics, and further afield to more practical topics like perfumes, swords, jewels, glass, dyes, zoology, tides, mirrors, meteorology and earthquakes.

In the field of mathematics, al-Kindi played an important role in introducing Hindu-Arabic numerals to the Islamic world, and their further development into Arabic numerals along with al-Khwarizmi, which eventually were adopted by the rest of the world. Al-Kindi was also one of the fathers of cryptography. Building on the work of al-Khalil (717–786), Al-Kindi's book entitled Manuscript on Deciphering Cryptographic Messages gave rise to the birth of cryptanalysis, was the earliest known use of statistical inference, and introduced several new methods of breaking ciphers, notably frequency analysis. He was able to create a scale that would enable doctors to gauge the effectiveness of their medication by combining his knowledge of mathematics and medicine.

The central theme underpinning al-Kindi's philosophical writings is the compatibility between philosophy and other "orthodox" Islamic sciences, particularly theology, and many of his works deal with subjects in which theologians had an immediate interest. These include the nature of God, the soul, and prophetic knowledge.

== Early life ==
Al-Kindi was born in Kufa to an aristocratic family of the Arabian tribe of the Kinda, descended from the chieftain al-Ash'ath ibn Qays, a contemporary of Muhammad. His was among the most prominent families of the tribal nobility of Kufa in the early Islamic period, until it lost much of its power following the revolt of Abd al-Rahman ibn Muhammad ibn al-Ash'ath. His father Ishaq was the governor of Basra and al-Kindi received his preliminary education there. He later went to complete his studies in Baghdad, where he was patronized by the Abbasid caliphs al-Ma'mun (r. 813–833) and al-Mu'tasim (r. 833–842). On account of his learning and aptitude for study, al-Ma'mun appointed him to the House of Wisdom, a recently established center for the translation of Greek philosophical and scientific texts, in Baghdad. He was also well known for his beautiful calligraphy, and at one point was employed as a calligrapher by Caliph al-Mutawakkil (r. 847–861).

When al-Ma'mun died, his brother, al-Mu'tasim became caliph. Al-Kindi's position would be enhanced under al-Mu'tasim, who appointed him as a tutor to his son. But on the accession of al-Wathiq (r. 842–847), and especially of al-Mutawakkil, al-Kindi's star waned. There are various theories concerning this: some attribute al-Kindi's downfall to scholarly rivalries at the House of Wisdom; others refer to al-Mutawakkil's often violent persecution of unorthodox Muslims (as well as of non-Muslims); at one point al-Kindi was beaten and his library temporarily confiscated. Henry Corbin, an authority on Islamic studies, says that in 873, al-Kindi died "a lonely man", in Baghdad during the reign of al-Mu'tamid (r. 870–892).

After his death, al-Kindi's philosophical works quickly fell into obscurity; many were lost even to later Islamic scholars and historians. Felix Klein-Franke suggests several reasons for this: aside from the militant orthodoxy of al-Mutawakkil, the Mongols also destroyed countless libraries during their invasion of Persia and Mesopotamia. However, he says the most probable cause of this was that his writings never found popularity amongst subsequent influential philosophers such as al-Farabi and Avicenna, who ultimately overshadowed him. His philosophical career peaked under al-Mu'tasim, to whom al-Kindi dedicated his most famous work, On First Philosophy, and whose son Ahmad was tutored by al-Kindi.

== Accomplishments ==
According to Arab bibliographer Ibn al-Nadim, al-Kindi wrote at least two hundred and sixty books, contributing heavily to geometry (thirty-two books), medicine and philosophy (twenty-two books each), logic (nine books), and physics (twelve books). Although most of his books have been lost over the centuries, a few have survived in the form of Latin translations by Gerard of Cremona, and others have been rediscovered in Arabic manuscripts; most importantly, twenty-four of his lost works were located in the mid-twentieth century in a Turkish library.

=== Philosophy ===
His greatest contribution to the development of Islamic philosophy was his efforts to make Greek thought both accessible and acceptable to a Muslim audience. Al-Kindi carried out this mission from the House of Wisdom, in Baghdad. As well as translating many important texts, much of what was to become standard Arabic philosophical vocabulary originated with al-Kindi; indeed, if it had not been for him, the work of philosophers like al-Farabi, Avicenna, and al-Ghazali might not have been possible.

In his writings, one of al-Kindi's central concerns was to demonstrate the compatibility between philosophy and natural theology on the one hand, and revealed or speculative theology on the other (though in fact he rejected speculative theology). Despite this, he did make clear that he believed revelation was a superior source of knowledge to reason because it guaranteed matters of faith that reason could not uncover. And while his philosophical approach was not always original, and was even considered clumsy by later thinkers (mainly because he was the first philosopher writing in the Arabic language), he successfully incorporated Aristotelian and (especially) neo-Platonist thought into an Islamic philosophical framework. This was an important factor in the introduction and popularization of Greek philosophy in the Muslim intellectual world.

=== Astronomy ===
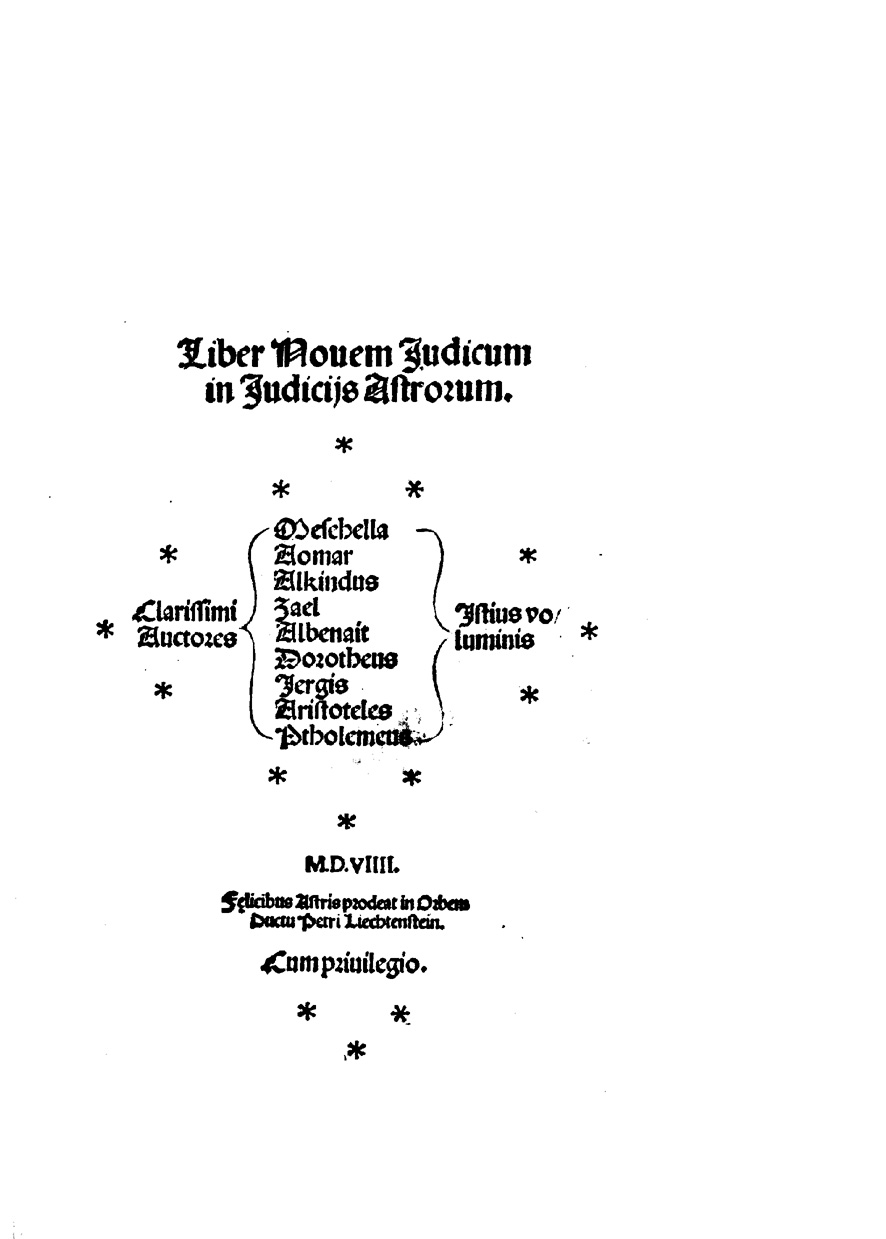
Liber novem iudicum in iudiciis astrorum, 1509

Al-Kindi took his view of the Solar System from Ptolemy, who placed the Earth at the centre of a series of concentric spheres, in which the known heavenly bodies (the Moon, Mercury, Venus, the Sun, Mars, Jupiter, and the stars) are embedded. In one of his treatises on the subject, he says that these bodies are rational entities, whose circular motion is in obedience to and worship of God. Their role, al-Kindi believes, is to act as instruments for divine providence. He furnishes empirical evidence as proof for this assertion; different seasons are marked by particular arrangements of the planets and stars (most notably the Sun); the appearance and manner of people varies according to the arrangement of heavenly bodies situated above their homeland.

However, he is ambiguous when it comes to the actual process by which the heavenly bodies affect the material world. One theory he posits in his works is from Aristotle, who conceived that the movement of these bodies causes friction in the sub-lunar region, which stirs up the primary elements of earth, fire, air and water, and these combine to produce everything in the material world. An alternative view found in the treatise On Rays (De radiis) is that the planets exercise their influence in straight lines; but this treatise, written by a Latin author, probably around the middle of the 13th century, is apocryphal. In each of these, two fundamentally different views of physical interaction are presented; action by contact and action at a distance. This dichotomy is duplicated in his writings on optics.

Some of the notable astrological works by al-Kindi include:

- The Book of the Judgement of the Stars, including The Forty Chapters, on questions and elections.
- On the Stellar Rays (spurious)
- Several epistles on weather and meteorology, including De mutatione temporum, ("On the Changing of the Weather").
- Treatise on the Judgement of Eclipses.
- Treatise on the Dominion of the Arabs and its Duration (used to predict the end of Arab rule).
- The Choices of Days (on elections).
- On the Revolutions of the Years (on mundane astrology and natal revolutions).
- De Signis Astronomiae Applicitis as Mediciam 'On the Signs of Astronomy as applied to Medicine'
- Treatise on the Spirituality of the Planets.

=== Optics ===
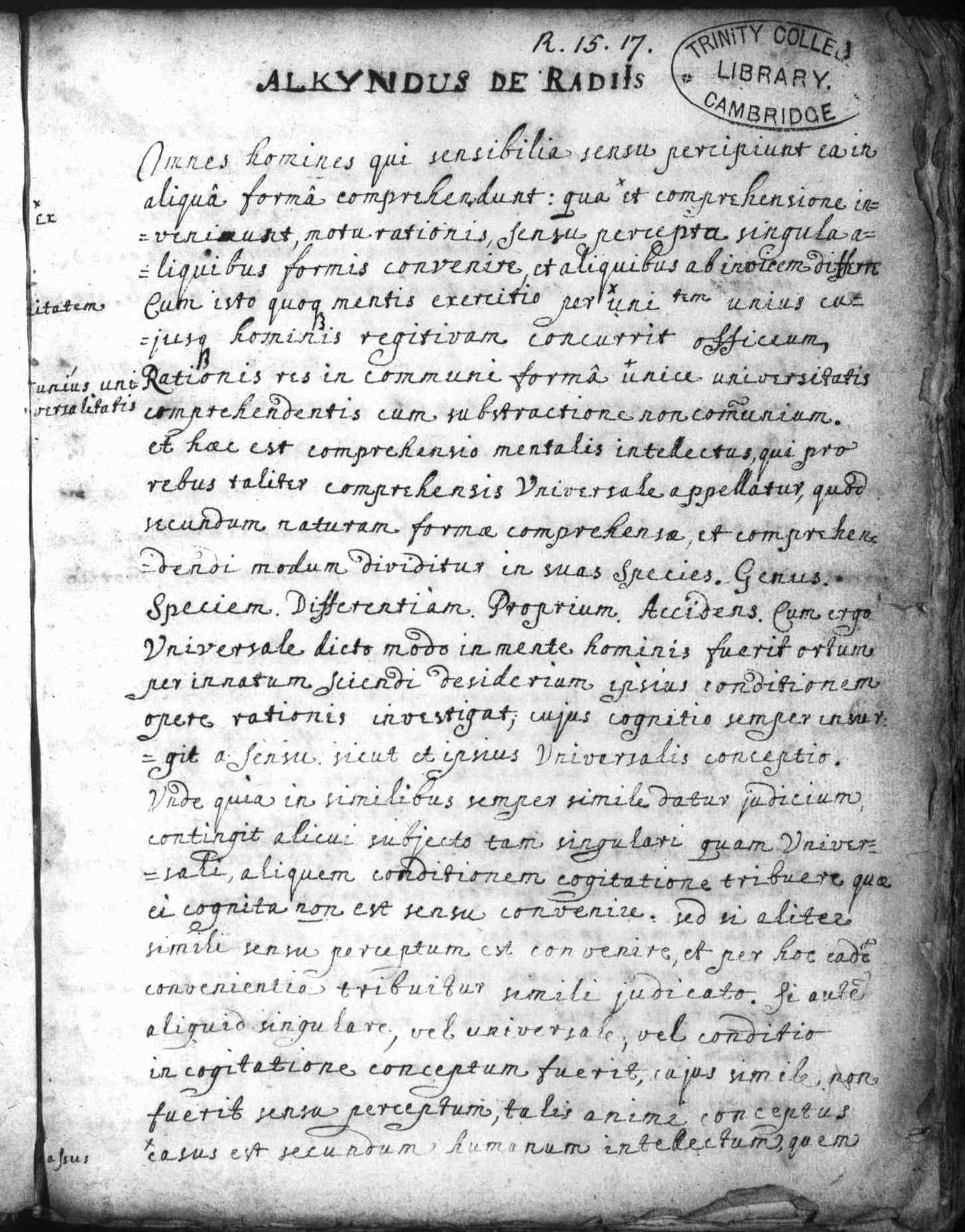
De radiis, manuscript, 17th century. Cambridge, Trinity College Library, Medieval manuscripts, MS R.15.17 (937).

Al-Kindi was the first major writer on optics since antiquity. Roger Bacon placed him in the first rank after Ptolemy as a writer on the topic. In the apocryphal work known as De radiis stellarum, is developed the theory "that everything in the world ... emits rays in every direction, which fill the whole world." This theory of the active power of rays had an influence on later scholars such as Ibn al-Haytham, Robert Grosseteste and Roger Bacon.

Two major theories of optics appear in the writings of al-Kindi: Aristotelian and Euclidean. Aristotle had believed that in order for the eye to perceive an object, both the eye and the object must be in contact with a transparent medium (such as air) that is filled with light. When these criteria are met, the "sensible form" of the object is transmitted through the medium to the eye. On the other hand, Euclid proposed that vision occurred in straight lines when "rays" from the eye reached an illuminated object and were reflected back. As with his theories on Astrology, the dichotomy of contact and distance is present in al-Kindi's writings on this subject as well.

The factor which al-Kindi relied upon to determine which of these theories was most correct was how adequately each one explained the experience of seeing. For example, Aristotle's theory was unable to account for why the angle at which an individual sees an object affects his perception of it. For example, why a circle viewed from the side will appear as a line. According to Aristotle, the complete sensible form of a circle should be transmitted to the eye and it should appear as a circle. On the other hand, Euclidean optics provided a geometric model that was able to account for this, as well as the length of shadows and reflections in mirrors, because Euclid believed that the visual "rays" could only travel in straight lines. For this reason, al-Kindi considered the latter preponderant.

Al-Kindi's primary optical treatise "De aspectibus" was later translated into Latin. This work, along with Alhazen's Optics and the Arabic translations of Ptolemy and Euclid's Optics, were the main Arabic texts to affect the development of optical investigations in Europe, most notably those of Robert Grosseteste, Vitello and Roger Bacon.

=== Medicine ===
There are more than thirty treatises attributed to al-Kindi in the field of medicine, in which he was chiefly influenced by the ideas of Galen. His most important work in this field is probably De Gradibus, in which he demonstrates the application of mathematics to medicine, particularly in the field of pharmacology. For example, he developed a mathematical scale to quantify the strength of a drug, and a system (based on the phases of the moon) that would allow a doctor to determine in advance the most critical days of a patient's illness. According to Plinio Prioreschi, this was the first attempt at serious quantification in medicine.

=== Chemistry ===
Al-Kindi denied the possibility of transmuting base metals into precious metals such as gold and silver, a position that was later attacked by the Persian alchemist and physician Abu Bakr al-Razi (c. 865 – c. 925).

One work attributed to al-Kindi, variously known as the Kitāb al-Taraffuq fī l-ʿiṭr ("The Book of Gentleness on Perfume") or the Kitāb Kīmiyāʾ al-ʿiṭr wa-l-taṣʿīdāt ("The Book of the Chemistry of Perfume and Distillations"), contains one of the earliest known references to the distillation of wine. The work also describes the distillation process for extracting rose oils, and provides recipes for 107 different kinds of perfumes.

=== Mathematics ===
Al-Kindi authored works on a number of important mathematical subjects, including arithmetic, geometry, the Hindu numbers, the harmony of numbers, lines and multiplication with numbers, relative quantities, measuring proportion and time, and numerical procedures and cancellation. He also wrote four volumes, On the Use of the Hindu Numerals (Arabic: كتاب في استعمال الأعداد الهندية Kitāb fī Isti`māl al-'A`dād al-Hindīyyah) which contributed greatly to diffusion of the Hindu system of numeration in the Middle-East and the West. In geometry, among other works, he wrote on the theory of parallels. Also related to geometry were two works on optics. One of the ways in which he made use of mathematics as a philosopher was to attempt to disprove the eternity of the world by demonstrating that actual infinity is a mathematical and logical absurdity.

=== Cryptography ===
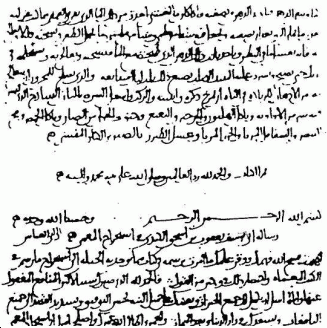
The first page of al-Kindi's manuscript "On Deciphering Cryptographic Messages", containing the oldest known description of cryptanalysis by frequency analysis.

Al-Kindi is credited with developing a method whereby variations in the frequency of the occurrence of letters could be analyzed and exploited to break ciphers (i.e. cryptanalysis by frequency analysis). His book on this topic is Risāla fī Istikhrāj al-Kutub al-Mu'ammāh (رسالة في استخراج الكتب المعماة; literally: On Extracting Obscured Correspondence, more contemporarily: On Decrypting Encrypted Correspondence). In his treatise on cryptanalysis, he wrote:

One way to solve an encrypted message, if we know its language, is to find a different plaintext of the same language long enough to fill one sheet or so, and then we count the occurrences of each letter. We call the most frequently occurring letter the "first", the next most occurring letter the "second", the following most occurring letter the "third", and so on, until we account for all the different letters in the plaintext sample. Then we look at the cipher text we want to solve and we also classify its symbols. We find the most occurring symbol and change it to the form of the "first" letter of the plaintext sample, the next most common symbol is changed to the form of the "second" letter, and the following most common symbol is changed to the form of the "third" letter, and so on, until we account for all symbols of the cryptogram we want to solve.

Al-Kindi was influenced by the work of al-Khalil (717–786), who wrote the Book of Cryptographic Messages, which contains the first use of permutations and combinations to list all possible Arabic words with and without vowels.

=== Meteorology ===
In a treatise entitled as Risala fi l-Illa al-Failali l-Madd wa l-Fazr (Treatise on the Efficient Cause of the Flow and Ebb), al-Kindi presents a theory on tides which "depends on the changes which take place in bodies owing to the rise and fall of temperature." In order to support his argument, he gave a description of a scientific experiment as follows:

One can also observe by the senses... how in consequence of extreme cold air changes into water. To do this, one takes a glass bottle, fills it completely with snow, and closes its end carefully. Then one determines its weight by weighing. One places it in a container... which has previously been weighed. On the surface of the bottle the air changes into water, and appears upon it like the drops on large porous pitchers, so that a considerable amount of water gradually collects inside the container. One then weighs the bottle, the water and the container, and finds their weight greater than previously, which proves the change. [...] Some foolish persons are of opinion that the snow exudes through the glass. This is impossible. There is no process by which water or snow can be made to pass through glass.

In explaining the natural cause of the wind, and the difference for its directions based on time and location, he wrote:

When the sun is in its northern declination northerly places will heat up and it will be cold towards the south. Then the northern air will expand in a southerly direction because of the heat due to the contraction of the southern air. Therefore most of the summer winds are merits and most of the winter winds are not.

=== Music theory ===
Al-Kindi was the first theoretician of music in the Arab-Islamic world whose works have come down to us. He transferred the Greek tonal system to the Arabic lute. Although he used tone letters (i.e. the Arabic alphabet), he also transferred the Greek tonal names to Arabic. He added a fifth string to the 'ud. He is known to have written treatises on music theory. The known indexes list a varying number of writings attributed to him, but only four have survived and can be attributed to him with certainty:

- Stringed Instruments from One String to Ten Strings.
- Epistle on Informative Parts on Music.
- Epistle on Modes and Tones.
- Epistle on the Knowledge of the Composition of Melodies.

His works include discussions on the therapeutic value of music and what he regarded as "cosmological connections" of music.

== Philosophical thought ==
=== Influences ===
While Muslim intellectuals were already acquainted with Greek philosophy (especially logic), al-Kindi is credited with being the first real Muslim philosopher. His own thought was largely influenced by the Neo-Platonic philosophy of Proclus, Plotinus and John Philoponus, amongst others, although he does appear to have borrowed ideas from other Hellenistic schools as well. He makes many references to Aristotle in his writings, but these are often unwittingly re-interpreted in a Neo-Platonic framework. This trend is most obvious in areas such as metaphysics and the nature of God as a causal entity. Experts have suggested that he was influenced by the Mutazilite school of theology, because of the mutual concern both he and they demonstrated for maintaining the singularity (tawhid) of God. A minority view however holds that such agreements are considered incidental.

=== Metaphysics ===
According to al-Kindi, the goal of metaphysics is knowledge of God. For this reason, he does not make a clear distinction between philosophy and theology, because he believes they are both concerned with the same subject. Later philosophers, particularly al-Farabi and Avicenna, would strongly disagree with him on this issue, by saying that metaphysics is actually concerned with being qua being, and as such, the nature of God is purely incidental.

Central to al-Kindi's understanding of metaphysics is God's absolute oneness, which he considers an attribute uniquely associated with God (and therefore not shared with anything else). By this he means that while we may think of any existent thing as being "one", it is in fact both "one" and many". For example, he says that while a body is one, it is also composed of many different parts. A person might say "I see an elephant", by which he means "I see one elephant", but the term 'elephant' refers to a species of animal that contains many. Therefore, only God is absolutely one, both in being and in concept, lacking any multiplicity whatsoever. Some feel this understanding entails a very rigorous negative theology because it implies that any description which can be predicated to anything else, cannot be said about God.

In addition to absolute oneness, al-Kindi also described God as the Creator. This means that He acts as both a final and efficient cause. Unlike later Muslim Neo-Platonic philosophers (who asserted that the universe existed as a result of God's existence "overflowing", which is a passive act), al-Kindi conceived of God as an active agent. In fact, of God as the agent, because all other intermediary agencies are contingent upon Him. The key idea here is that God "acts" through created intermediaries, which in turn "act" on one another – through a chain of cause and effect – to produce the desired result. In reality, these intermediary agents do not "act" at all, they are merely a conduit for God's own action. This is especially significant in the development of Islamic philosophy, as it portrayed the "first cause" and "unmoved mover" of Aristotelian philosophy as compatible with the concept of God according to Islamic revelation.

=== Epistemology ===
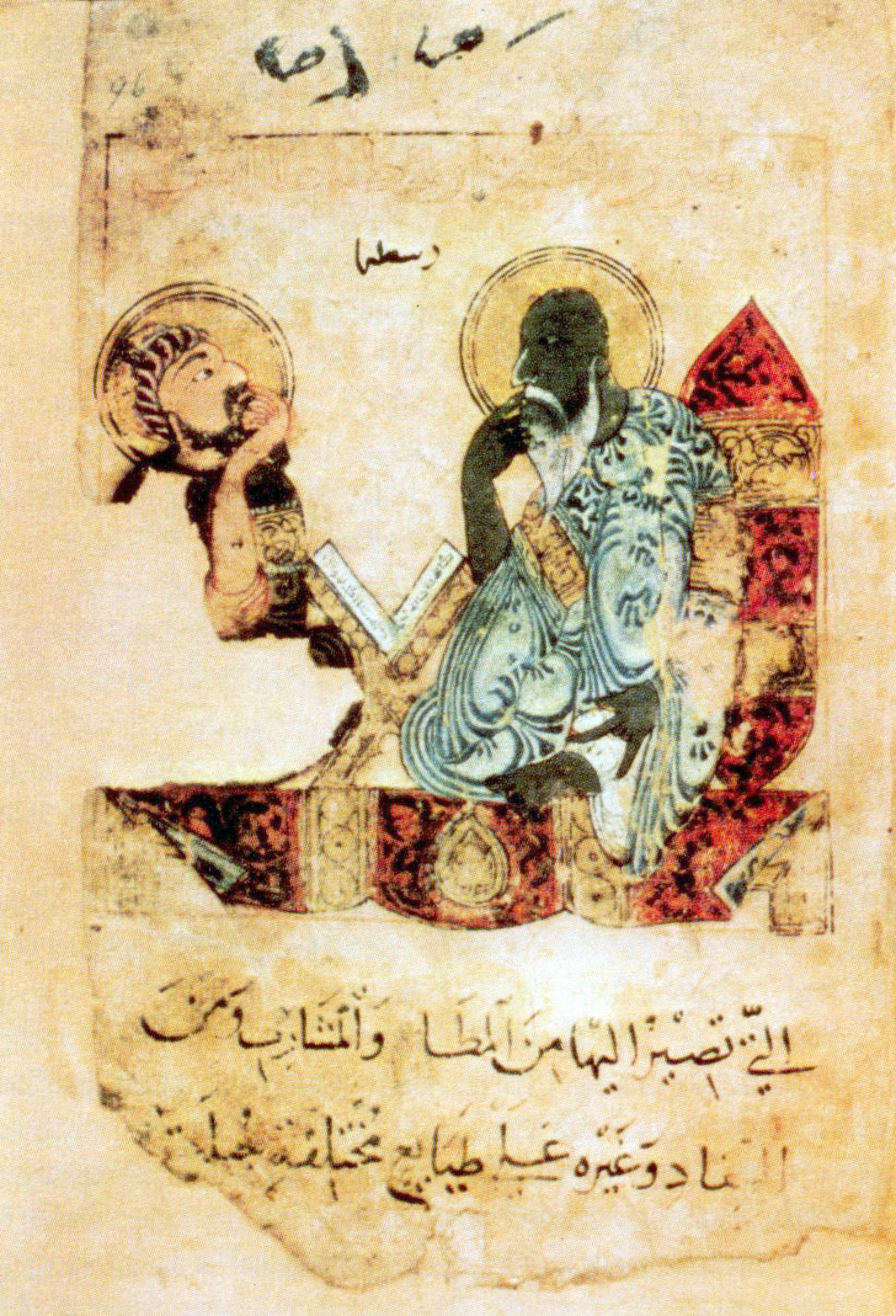
Ancient Greek philosophers such as Plato and Aristotle were highly respected in the medieval Islamic world.

Al-Kindi theorized that there was a separate, incorporeal and universal intellect (known as the "First Intellect"). It was the first of God's creation and the intermediary through which all other things came into creation. Aside from its obvious metaphysical importance, it was also crucial to al-Kindi's epistemology, which was influenced by Platonic realism.

According to Plato, everything that exists in the material world corresponds to certain universal forms in the heavenly realm. These forms are really abstract concepts such as a species, quality or relation, which apply to all physical objects and beings. For example, a red apple has the quality of "redness" derived from the appropriate universal. However, al-Kindi says that human intellects are only potentially able to comprehend these. This potential is actualized by the First Intellect, which is perpetually thinking about all of the universals. He argues that the external agency of this intellect is necessary by saying that human beings cannot arrive at a universal concept merely through perception. In other words, an intellect cannot understand the species of a thing simply by examining one or more of its instances. According to him, this will only yield an inferior "sensible form", and not the universal form which we desire. The universal form can only be attained through contemplation and actualization by the First Intellect.

The analogy he provides to explain his theory is that of wood and fire. Wood, he argues, is potentially hot (just as a human is potentially thinking about a universal), and therefore requires something else which is already hot (such as fire) to actualize this. This means that for the human intellect to think about something, the First Intellect must already be thinking about it. Therefore, he says that the First Intellect must always be thinking about everything. Once the human intellect comprehends a universal by this process, it becomes part of the individual's "acquired intellect" and can be thought about whenever he or she wishes.

=== The soul and the afterlife ===
Al-Kindi says that the soul is a simple, immaterial substance, which is related to the material world only because of its faculties which operate through the physical body. To explain the nature of our worldly existence, he (borrowing from Epictetus) compares it to a ship which has, during the course of its ocean voyage, temporarily anchored itself at an island and allowed its passengers to disembark. The implicit warning is that those passengers who linger too long on the island may be left behind when the ship sets sail again. Here, al-Kindi displays a stoic concept, that we must not become attached to material things (represented by the island), as they will invariably be taken away from us (when the ship sets sail again). He then connects this with a Neo-Platonist idea, by saying that our soul can be directed towards the pursuit of desire or the pursuit of intellect; the former will tie it to the body, so that when the body dies, it will also die, but the latter will free it from the body and allow it to survive "in the light of the Creator" in a realm of pure intelligence.

=== The relationship between revelation and philosophy ===
In the view of al-Kindi, prophecy and philosophy were two different routes to arrive at the truth. He contrasts the two positions in four ways. Firstly, while a person must undergo a long period of training and study to become a philosopher, prophecy is bestowed upon someone by God. Secondly, the philosopher must arrive at the truth by his own devices (and with great difficulty), whereas the prophet has the truth revealed to him by God. Thirdly, the understanding of the prophet – being divinely revealed – is clearer and more comprehensive than that of the philosopher. Fourthly, the way in which the prophet is able to express this understanding to the ordinary people is superior. Therefore, al-Kindi says the prophet is superior in two fields: the ease and certainty with which he receives the truth, and the way in which he presents it. However, the crucial implication is that the content of the prophet's and the philosopher's knowledge is the same. This, says Adamson, demonstrates how limited the superiority al-Kindi afforded to prophecy was.

In addition to this, al-Kindi adopted a naturalistic view of prophetic visions. He argued that, through the faculty of "imagination" as conceived of in Aristotelian philosophy, certain "pure" and well-prepared souls, were able to receive information about future events. Significantly, he does not attribute such visions or dreams to revelation from God, but instead explains that imagination enables human beings to receive the "form" of something without needing to perceive the physical entity to which it refers. Therefore, it would seem to imply that anyone who has purified themselves would be able to receive such visions. It is precisely this idea, amongst other naturalistic explanations of prophetic miracles that al-Ghazali attacks in his Incoherence of the Philosophers.

=== Critics and patrons ===
While al-Kindi appreciated the usefulness of philosophy in answering questions of a religious nature, there would be many Islamic thinkers who were not as enthusiastic about its potential. But it would be incorrect to assume that they opposed philosophy simply because it was a "foreign science". Oliver Leaman, an expert on Islamic philosophy, points out that the objections of notable theologians are rarely directed at philosophy itself, but rather at the conclusions the philosophers arrived at. Even al-Ghazali, who is famous for his critique of the philosophers, was himself an expert in philosophy and logic. And his criticism was that they arrived at theologically erroneous conclusions. The three most serious of these, in his view, were believing in the co-eternity of the universe with God, denying the bodily resurrection, and asserting that God only has knowledge of abstract universals, not of particular things (not all philosophers subscribed to these same views).

During his life, al-Kindi was fortunate enough to enjoy the patronage of the pro-Mutazilite Caliphs al-Ma'mun and al-Mu'tasim, which meant he could carry out his philosophical speculations with relative ease. In his own time, al-Kindi would be criticized for extolling the "intellect" as being the most immanent creation in proximity to God, which was commonly held to be the position of the angels. He also engaged in disputations with certain Mutazilites, whom he attacked for their belief in atoms, as not all Mutazilites accepted the belief of atomism. But the real role of al-Kindi in the conflict between philosophers and theologians would be to prepare the ground for debate. His works, says Deborah Black, contained all the seeds of future controversy that would be fully realized in al-Ghazali's Incoherence of the Philosophers.

== Legacy ==
Al-Kindi was a master of many different areas of thought and was held to be one of the greatest philosophers. His influence in the fields of physics, mathematics, medicine, philosophy, and music were far-reaching and lasted for several centuries. Ibn al-Nadim in his Kitab al-Fihrist praised al-Kindi and his work stating:

The best man of his time, unique in his knowledge of all the ancient sciences. He is called the Philosopher of the Arabs. His books deal with different sciences, such as logic, philosophy, geometry, arithmetic, astronomy, etc. We have connected him with the natural philosophers because of his prominence in Science.

Al-Kindi's major contribution was his establishment of philosophy in the Islamic world and his efforts in trying to harmonize the philosophical investigation along with the Islamic theology and creed. The philosophical texts which were translated under his supervision would become the standard texts in the Islamic world for centuries to come, even after his influence has been eclipsed by later Philosophers.

Al-Kindi was also an important figure in medieval Europe. Several of his books got translated into Latin influencing Western authors like Robert Grosseteste and Roger Bacon. The Italian Renaissance scholar Gerolamo Cardano (1501–1575) considered him one of the twelve greatest minds.

Al-Kindi’s enduring legacy is celebrated both across the Arab World and on the global stage through numerous public tributes. In 1986, the Royal Commission for Riyadh City inaugurated the Al Kindi Plaza in the Diplomatic Quarter district of Riyadh, Saudi Arabia. More recently, in 2026, Saudi author Ashraf Fagih published The Philosopher; a historical novel that chronicles the life and intellectual achievements of Al-Kindi.

== Bibliography ==
=== English translations ===
- Adamson, Peter; Pormann, Peter E., eds. (2012). The Philosophical Works of al-Kindī. New York: Oxford University Press.
- Farmer, Henry George (1955–56). "Al-Kindi on the 'Ethos' of Rhythm, Colour, and Perfume". Transactions of the Glasgow University Oriental Society. 16. Glasgow: Glasgow University Oriental Society.

=== Works about al-Kindi ===
- Adamson, Peter (2007). Al-Kindī. Oxford University Press US. ISBN 978-0-19-518142-5.
- Adamson, Peter (2005). "Al-Kindī and the reception of Greek philosophy". In Adamson, Peter; Taylor, Richard C. (eds.). The Cambridge Companion to Arabic Philosophy. Cambridge University Press. pp. 32–51. doi:10.1017/CCOL0521817439.003. ISBN 978-0-521-81743-1.
- Arrington, Robert L., ed. (2001). A Companion to the Philosophers. Oxford: Blackwell. ISBN 978-0-631-22967-4.
- Corbin, Henry (1993). History of Islamic Philosophy. London: Keagan Paul. ISBN 9781135198886.
- Klein-Franke, Felix (2001). "Al-Kindi". In Leaman, Oliver; Nasr, Hossein (eds.). History of Islamic Philosophy. London: Routledge. ISBN 9780415131599.
- Prioreschi, Plinio (2002). "Al-Kindi, A Precursor of the Scientific Revolution" (PDF). Journal of the International Society for the History of Islamic Medicine. 2: 17–19.
- Prioreschi, Plinio (1996). "Medicine: al-Kindi". A History of Medicine: Byzantine and Islamic medicine. Vol. 4. Omaha: Horatius Press. pp. 227–235.
- Schewe, Stephanie (2018). Al-Kindī und die Wirkung der Musik. 'Das Buch der Chordophone von den einsaitigen bis zu den zehnsaitigen' (Kitāb al-muṣawwitāt al-watariyya min ḏāt al-watar al-wāḥid ilā ḏāt al-ʿašarat al-autār). Frankfurt: Institute for the History of Arabic-Islamic Science. ISBN 978-3-8298-5015-5.
