= The Turban and the Hat =

2008 novel by Sonallah Ibrahim

- Author: Sonallah Ibrahim
- Language: Arabic
- Genre: Novel
- Publication date: 2008

The Turban and the Hat (Arabic: العمامة و القبعة) is a novel written by the Egyptian author Sonallah Ibrahim that was released in 2008 by The Arab Future House (original title: Dar Al-Mostakbal al-Arabi) in 332 medium-cut pages, addressing the East-West discussion and their conflict. The book may be read as a novel or as a historical work based on Abd al-Rahman al-Jabarti's book "The wonders of antiquities in translations and news".

== Summary ==
The novel begins on 22 July 1798, with the protagonist, the narrator of the events, informing us of the defeat of the Mamluk Army under the command of "Murat Bey" at the Imbaba event, followed by the attempt of "Ibrahim Bey" and his Mamluks, as well as those who joined him from the general public, in a desperate attempt to defeat the "French campaign in Egypt" at Bulaq. The "French campaign in Egypt" approaches Cairo under the leadership of "Napoleon Bonaparte's campaign", waving flyers stating that he respected the Islamic religion and Muhammad and the Quran, that he was more faithful than the Mamluks, and that he wore the Jibba and Kaftan. The events of the novel then begin in the form of dairies written by al-Jabarti's pupil about the events on an almost daily basis. The protagonist's diaries cover a full elaborated detail throughout the era of the French colonization entry into Egypt. The crisis reveals itself in the cohabitation with the colonizer and his hostility. Followed by the traders who take advantage of the crisis to stockpile products, and the privileged class that just defends their influence and rides the wave of patriotism as long as it's in their favor. The contradiction was that the French, who had recently emerged through a deadly revolution advocated freedom, fraternity and equality to find themselves portrayed as just an invaders and murderers serving Bonaparte's ambitions. There is also the moral instability caused by the entrance and empowerment of the outsiders. This is a concern for all those who oppose civilizational cohabitation. A love relationship is established between the hero and a young member of the occupier.

== Criticism ==
Ashraf Fagih wrote on the "Al-Qafila magazine" website:” Sonallah Ibrahim evokes in his novel the fiction and events of the past to hold two trials in the present: a trial of the Arabic personality which is still longing for and far from renaissance, and a second trial of the spirit of imperialism and of the culture of contemporary globalization, originally seeking to dominate the abilities of the people, the early signs of which have been exemplified by Napoleon’s adventure in the east, a trial whose chapters are still held even as the novel’s chapters end. The author deliberately reminds us of how complex, ancient, and paradoxical these issues are. In his novel, he leaves us hanging between two conflicting and fundamental realities: how different and contradictory we are by race, belief and interest, how similar and close we are by virtue of our belonging to the human race and being at the mercy of the same emotions and instincts. We… As the title of the novel indicates… all wear headdresses. For some it’s called a turban. And for others, it's just a hat.

On April 24, 2018, "Ahmed Arafa" wrote: “Sonallah Ibrahim left all the real characters and made the protagonist in his novel a young Saidi man who neighboured Al-Azhar and was companied by Al-Jabrati to his house as his student… The novel is distinctively historical, and its general style is memoirs and diaries… But the novel raises an old and historical question about the falsification in history in general, especially since it is the victor who eventually writes history. The writer referred to this ugly face of chronicling when, after the departure of the French campaign in Egypt, Al-Jabarti decided to return to what he wrote to erase what he favored from the French campaign in Egypt, so as not to clash with the current Turkish ruler at the time, and to exempt himself from the charge of cooperation with the French campaign in Egypt… The novel puts many spotlights on dark areas in Egyptian history, in politics, culture, economy and society, all of which we will address in detail hereafter.

On July 25, 2011 “Al Ghad” website wrote: “An entertaining work with flexible boundaries... Ibrahim was able to transform historical events by choosing and controlling their context, into an interesting scenario and into quite a revival of the events of history and what looks like an introduction of anecdotal possibilities, or what seems to be a development of these possibilities... Ibrahim’s work was based on several translated foreign and Arab literature about the period of French campaign attempt to colonize Egypt. Sonallah Ibrahim does not leave events “unsaid”, but it surges directly and deliberately to “speak”, that is, until it lays bare what is at times beyond the event.

On February 18, 2009 "Mufeed Najem" wrote on the "Al-Ittihad newspaper" website: “The Turban and the Hat" Novel by Egyptian novelist Sonallah Ibrahim raises a problematic issue concerning the boundaries between the role of a novelist and a historian, as the novelist tries to play the role of the historian but from a mismatched perspective, reflecting a conflicting ideology... The novel recalls the echo of the place through the protagonist’s movements and revealing its details and names, as well as evoking many customs and traditions that were prevalent at the time, and using slang that the general public spoke, in order to emphasize and showcase the realism of events and social life. The multiplicity of the novel's language manifests itself through diversity in the novel's language, which uses the document briefly and intensification.

Dr. Faisal daraj sees that “The novel represents the memory of the oppressed and marginalized one's, in accordance with the practice of the late great novelist Abdul Rahman Munif, who worked in many of his novels to read history with a critical eye, in order to employ it in the structure of the narrative speech, away from the pleasure of "nostalgia" rewriting history.”

On September 14, 2008, Dr. Zaine Abdul Hady commented in Youm7, “The key to this work begins with Mohieddine Ellabbad’s cover, and I feel that this cover alone symbolizes a qualitative leap in Egyptian novel covers.” The cover blends voyeurism, austerity, attraction, and dictatorial power, which perceives only its own unity in life. With what is happening today, Sonallah Ibrahim has not left the Egyptian street. He accuses everyone and points his finger at anybody he wants, including all those who were involved in the crime. What is happening today is the same as it was yesterday; the mob and ignorance are the ones who move the street and turn it over on both sides. “ the history cycle repeats itself; Egyptians commit the same crime, and gentlemen commit the same crime. The occupier, Cairo, repeating its deeds unmistakably, ignorantly, and with a deliberate structure, This is what I saw In The Turban and the Hat.

Egyptian academic Dr. Ibrahim Awad, on the website of "Diwan Al-Arab", he attacked Sonalla Ibrahim, saying: "It is not good to draw characters, as it does not differentiate here, for example, between a religious young man who works as an assistant to the leader of modern Muslim historians, an atheist who does not believe in God or the Last Day, for example, or a heretic who does not care about ("haram and halal" "Sinner and permissible") or a communist...In vain the honorable reader wonders about the wisdom of the writer including those sexual scenes in his book. It is the same sexual relationship that was between the narrator and both the "Odalisque" and "Pauline", as it is very possible to delete the pages that contain talking about this subject without causing any disruption in the book at all..... Sonallah Ibrahim is cautious, without the slightest thing on which to rely, to distort Al-Jabarti...the book contain severe and indecent linguistic errors…the style in which the book was drafted does not fit the era of the French campaign.

Ahmed al-Arabi wrote on the Forum of Arabs on July 29, 2021: “We are infant of a harrowing and painful but real scene. We have long been victims between an unjust ruler and an assailant who treats us as an investment and colonialism, with complete disregard for our humanity. The roots of the Arab Spring run deep into history.

On the website of the monthly magazine “Al- kalima”, Ali al-Damini analyzed the book “The Turban and the Hat”, which came with: “ the portrait drawn by Mohieddin Ellabbad”, using the combination of paintings of three French painters… looking closely at our book of life and history, and comparing it with the pages of the French campaign, and the modern occupation of our countries, we realize that the depth of our tragedy lies not only in the fact that we’ve been victimized and targeted by others rapacity … But in numerous volitional reasons.

Al Jazeera Net wrote on May 20, 2008: “In this novel, Sonallah Ibrahim was able to transform historical events, whether in the way it was chosen or in controlling its context, into interesting scenarios, basing his works on several foreign translated and Arabic literature about the French campaign against Egypt.” The writer described Sonallah’s novel stating: “He mentions the history of Islam in Jurji Zaydan's novels mainly in terms of commitment to the historical event, even if it was interpreted or understood somehow differently, all while utilizing the spaces between the events to weave a love story that sometimes holds unique perspectives.
