= Kitab al-Musiqa al-Kabir =

Treatise on music

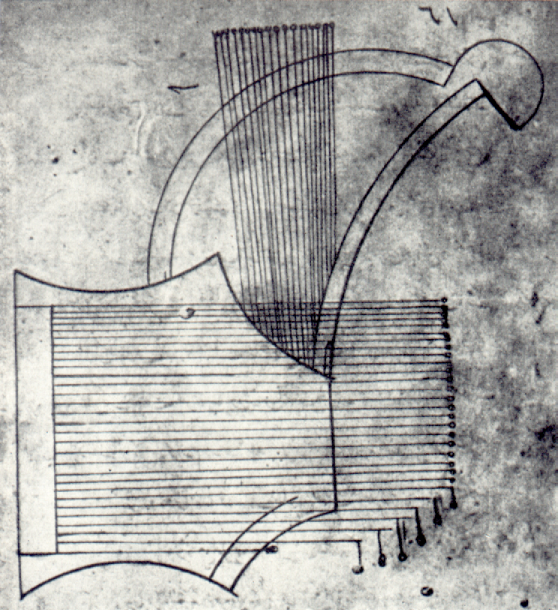
Illustration from Al-Fārābī (about 870-950): Kitāb al-mūsīqī al kabīr Drawing of a musical instrument, called Shahrud

Kitab al-Musiqa al-Kabir (Arabic: كِتٰبَ ٱلمُوْسِيقَىٰ ٱلكَبِيرُ, transl. the Great Book of Music) is a treatise on music in Arabic by the Islamic Golden Era iranian philosopher al-Farabi (872–950/951).

The work prescribes different aspects of music such as maqamat, and is believed to be influenced by the Pythagorean theory of harmonic ratios.

The book was translated into Hebrew by Joseph ben Judah ibn Aknin.

== Content ==
Al-Farabi divided Kitab al-Musiqa al-Kabir into two treatises.

The first treatise is composed of two parts; following the Aristotelian tradition, al-Farabi split his study of music into a theoretical and practical aspect:

- The first part, which consists of two discourses, is an introduction which establishes the theoretical principles of music and investigation into how sound is generated.
- The second part applies the theoretical principles established in the first part to the musical instruments that were in use during al-Farabi’s time, while also discussing musical intervals and different kinds of melodies.

The second treatise was intended to be a commentary to the thought of previous theorists of music, but it is not extant.
