= Majid Fakhry =

Lebanese scholar of Islamic philosophy (1923 - 2021)

Majid Fakhry (1923 – March 4, 2021) was a prominent Lebanese scholar of Islamic philosophy, notably an expert of Farabi, and Professor Emeritus of philosophy at the American University of Beirut.

== Biography ==
Majid Fakhry was born in 1923 in Lebanon. After earning his bachelor's and master's degrees from the American University of Beirut, Fakhry received his Ph.D. in philosophy from University of Edinburgh in 1949. He taught at the London School of Oriental Studies, UCLA, Princeton University, and Georgetown University, where he spent his final years as professor emeritus, in addition to teaching and leading the Philosophy Department at the American University of Beirut. Fakhry's courses at AUB provided many students with their first introduction to the history of philosophy between the 1950s and the 1980s. Fakhry died in Virginia, United States on March 4, 2021.

Fakhry published A History of Islamic Philosophy in 1970, it is considered the first historical overview on Islamic thought and was well received. Columbia University Press published a revised 3rd edition of Fakhry's A History of Islamic Philosophy in 2004. He also wrote an introduction on Farabi's thought under a Neoplatonist perspective.

== Works ==
- A History of Islamic Philosophy (1970)
- Ethical Theories in Islam (1991)
- Philosophy, Dogma, and the Impact of Greek Thought in Islam (1994)
- An Interpretation of the Qur'an: English Translation of the Meanings (2015)
- Al-Farabi Founder of Islamic Neoplatonism : His Life, Works and Influence (2002)
- Islamic Philosophy : A Beginner's Guide
- Averroes: His Life, Work and Influence
