= Wasij =

Village in Kazakhstan

Coordinates: 42°57′6″N 68°1′57″E

Wasij was a village near Farab in Kazakhstan and the birthplace of the Central Asian scientist Al-Farabi.
