= Diplomatic Quarter (Riyadh) =

District in northwestern Riyadh, Saudi Arabia

Diplomatic Quarter حي السفارات
- Neighbourhood
- Hayy Assafarat Grand Mosque, 2024

- Location within Saudi Arabia
- Coordinates: 24°40′52″N 46°37′22″E
- Country: Saudi Arabia
- City: Riyadh
- Established: 1978; 48 years ago
- Founder: Salman bin Abdulaziz

Government
  - Body: Royal Commission for Riyadh City

Language
  - Official: Arabic
- PIN: 12511-4

The Diplomatic Quarter (DQ) (Arabic: حي السفارات, romanized: Hayy as-Safarat, lit. 'embassies neighborhood'), also known by its Arabic name as-Safarat, is a diplomatic enclave and an affluent residential district in northwestern Riyadh, Saudi Arabia, situated near Irqah. Established in 1978, it covers an area of 800 hectares and hosts most of the foreign embassies and some of the government departments in the city besides being a popular tourist attraction. It was administered as part of the Irqah Sub-Municipality until 2018 when the district's responsibility was placed under the newly created Diplomatic Quarter General Authority (DQGA). In 2021, the authority was dissolved and subsequently Diplomatic Quarter became an independent neighbourhood.

== History ==
The Diplomatic Quarter was established on November 25, 1975, through a Council of Ministers resolution during the reign of King Khalid upon the relocation of the headquarters of the Ministry of Foreign Affairs from Jeddah to Riyadh. It was the brainchild of Riyadh's then governor Prince Salman bin Abdulaziz al-Saud. It was built between 1978 and 1982. On 27 November 2018, a royal decree issued by King Salman instructed the creation of the Diplomatic Quarter Authority which would be independent of Riyadh Municipality's Irqah Sub-Municipality and would be responsible for the administration of the district. In February 2021, the authority was abolished and its administration was transferred to the Royal Commission for Riyadh City.

== Urban planning and character ==
The Diplomatic Quarter was planned as a model neighborhood combining diplomatic, residential and civic functions. The Royal Commission for Riyadh City describes the district as accommodating embassies and international organizations, with infrastructure intended to provide a cultural, architectural and environmental model. The area is also known for its landscaped streets, parks and distinctive embassy buildings, and is visited as a recreational destination in Riyadh.

== Landmarks ==
- Tuwaiq Palace
- Oud Square

=== Schools ===
- King Faisal School
- British International School Riyadh (BISR), DQ campus

=== Parks ===
- Al Khuzama Park (The Groves)
- Richard Bodeker Park
- Yamama Park
- Rock Park

=== Hotels ===
- Marriott Riyadh Diplomatic Quarter
- Radisson Blu Hotel and Residence

=== Places of worship ===
- Hayy Assafarat Grand Mosque

=== Marketplaces ===
- Al-Kindi Plaza
- Tamimi Markets DQ branch
- Al Fazari Plaza
