= Hayy Assafarat Grand Mosque =

Mosque in Riyadh, Saudi Arabia

- Arabic: جامع حي السفارات
- Hayy Assafarat Grand Mosque, 2024

- Location of the mosque in Saudi Arabia

Religion
- Affiliation: Sunni Islam
- Ecclesiastical or organizational status: Friday mosque
- Status: Active

Location
- Location: Al Kindi Plaza, Diplomatic Quarter, Riyadh
- Country: Saudi Arabia
- Interactive map of Hayy Assafarat Grand Mosque
- Coordinates: 24°40′55″N 46°37′23″E

Architecture
- Architect: Beeah Group
- Type: Mosque architecture
- Groundbreaking: 1983
- Completed: 1986

Specifications
- Capacity: 5,000 worshippers
- Interior area: 5,830 m^{2} (62,800 sq ft)
- Minaret: 2
- Materials: Reinforced concrete; stucco; marble

The Hayy Assafarat Grand Mosque (Arabic: جامع حي السفارات, lit. 'embassies neighborhood mosque'), also known as the Al-Kindy Square Mosque, is a Sunni Islam Friday mosque, located in the Diplomatic Quarter district of Riyadh, Saudi Arabia.

With a prayer hall of almost 5,830 square metres (62,800 sq ft), the mosque can accommodate almost 5,000 worshippers. It was built between 1983 and 1986 during the development of the Al Kindi Plaza, where it stands and is an engaging feature.

== Overview ==
The mosque was being planned as part of the Diplomatic Quarter district development project. In 1981, construction began on the 2.6-hectare (6.4-acre) site of Al Kindi Plaza, which aimed to serve the recreational needs of foreign embassy staff and their families. Beeah Group was given the contract of designing the square in order to cater to the religious requirements of diplomats from Muslim countries, the construction of a central mosque began in 1983 and was completed in 1986.

The mosque is a recipient of the Aga Khan Award for Architecture in 1990, the Symposiume on Mosque Architecture Award by King Saud University in 1996, and the Abdullatif Al Fozan Award in 2014.

== See also ==
- Islam in Saudi Arabia
- List of mosques in Saudi Arabia
