= Al Kindi Plaza =

Market square in Riyadh, Saudi Arabia

Al-Kindi Plaza
- Market square
- Arabic: ساحة الكندي
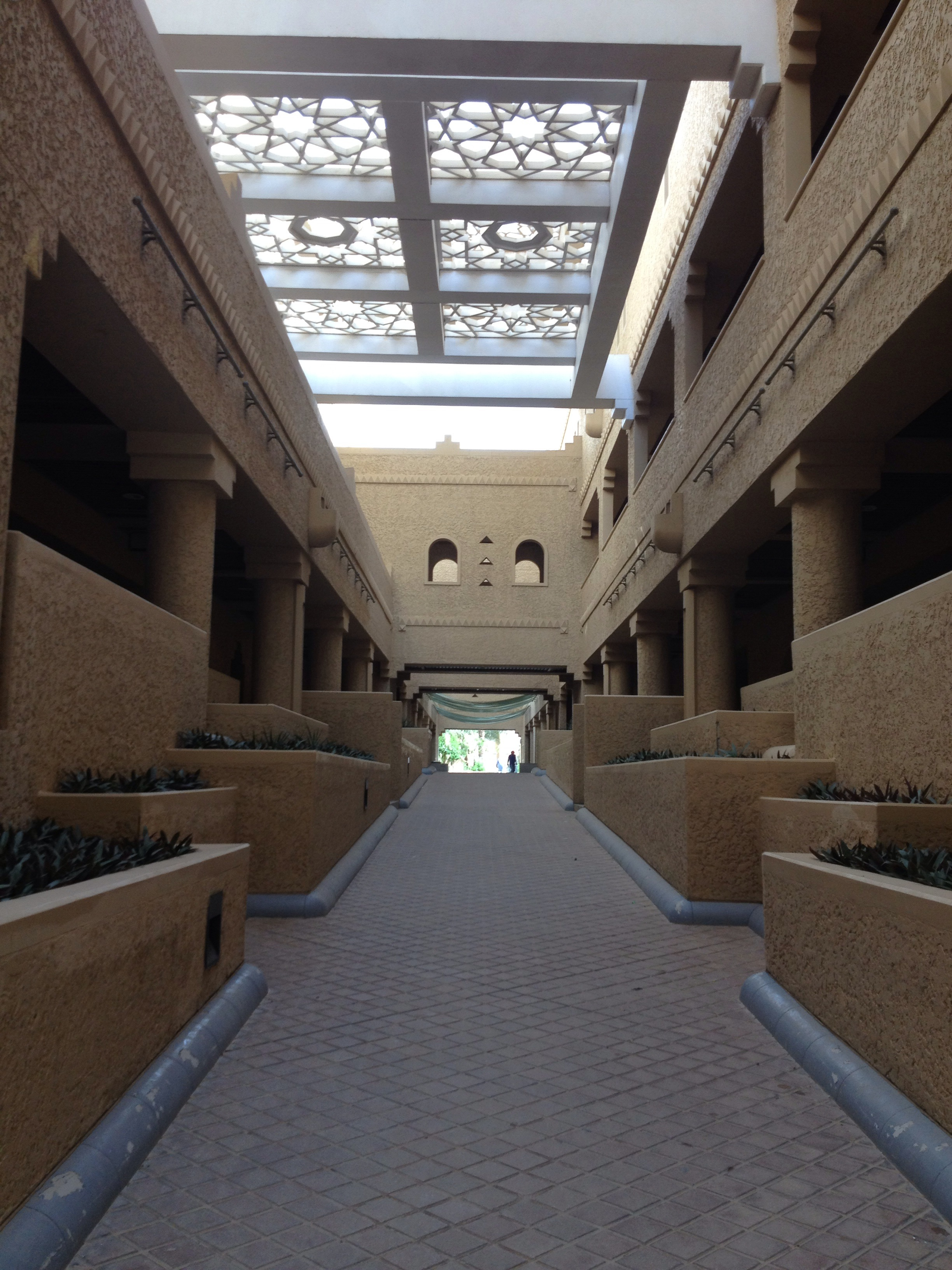
- Alleyways of al-Kindi Plaza, 2013
- Design: Beeah Group
- Constructed: 1981
- Opened: 1986
- Area: 26,000 square metres (2.6 ha)
- Dedicated to: Al-Kindi
- Owner: Royal Commission for Riyadh City
- Location: Diplomatic Quarter; Riyadh, Saudi Arabia
- Location within Saudi Arabia
- Coordinates: 24°40′55″N 46°37′23″E

Al-Kindi Plaza (Arabic: ساحة الكندي, lit. 'Al-Kindi Square'), or Al-Kindi Square, is a multipurpose market square in Diplomatic Quarter, Riyadh, Saudi Arabia, located next to the Cultural Palace. Completed in 1986, it is named after the 9th century Arab philosopher and polymath Abu Yusuf al-Kindi. It contains the Hayy Assafarat Grand Mosque, a library, garden, courtyard and the offices of the Royal Commission for Riyadh City and the MiSK Foundation.

== Overview ==
In 1975, the Saudi government announced plans to relocate the headquarters of the country's foreign ministry from Jeddah to Riyadh and intended to construct a new enclave in northwest of the capital, known as the Diplomatic Quarter in order to house foreign diplomatic missions.

The Al-Kindi Plaza was inaugurated in 1986 to cater the needs of the residents of Diplomatic Quarter, incorporating traditional Najdi architecture with modern materials. In 1989, it became a recipient of the Aga Khan Award for Architecture.

The market square contains a Friday mosque, which was built between 1983 and 1986, triangular public square, book galleries, garden and government offices complex. It is located opposite to the headquarters of the Ministry of Tourism.

The central mosque is one of the salient features of the plaza that represents the strong traditional links between religion and public services. The plaza's landscaping consists of shaded arcades, small fountains and other water elements, and planters.

Modern imported technology was used to build the Al-Kindi Plaza. Reinforced concrete was used in the framed system with hollow concrete blocks for the infill; precast slabs were also used in certain parts of the building. Insulated tiled roofs and suspended ceiling complete the modern look. However, by using stucco spray on metal lath, the traditional Najdi facade of mud plaster finish on adobe (mud-brick) was preserved as a design feature. Imported marble tiles were used for flooring in the public spaces in addition to local cement.

Al-Kindi Plaza usually gets crowded during weekends, religious festivities such as Eid al-Fitr, Eid al-Adha and public holidays such as Saudi National Day and Saudi Founding Day besides other organized events and celebrations.
