= Irqah =

Neighborhood and former town in western Riyadh, Saudi Arabia

Coordinates: 24.687°N 46.582°E

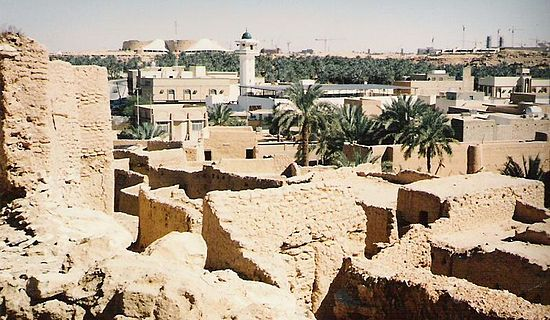
Irqah

Irqah (Arabic: عرقة), also romanized as Ergah, is a town in the northwestern fringes of Riyadh in Riyadh Governorate, Saudi Arabia. Nowadays Irqah is considered to be a neighbourhood in Riyadh, and is part of the sub-municipality of its namesake, Baladiyah al-Irqah.

== See also ==
- Najd
- Al-Yamama
- Wadi Hanifa
- Diriyah
