= Tenth intellect =

Primordial being in the cosmological doctrine of the Tayyibi branch of Ismaili Shia Islam

The tenth intellect (Aashir Mudabbir or Aql al-Aashir), (Note: Sufis believe that Allah created intellects (uqul) and then asked them to accept His godhood (uluhiyyah). One intellect declared faith in His uluhiyyah and came to be designated as aql-e-awwal, next who accepted came to be called as aql-i-thani and so on until aql-i-'ashir (10th intellect) and remaining turned into black heavy matter from pure light and now it is for the 10th intellect to turn those who refused to accept godhood back into pure light. Thus it is 10th intellect also called ashir-e-mudabbir (the 10th intellect who manages) who created this universe and human beings into it to turn them back into pure light and in every cycled some souls will be turned into pure light those who successfully resist evil and do good deeds.) also known as the Demiurge (mudabbir) or Spiritual Adam (Adam al-Ruhani), is a primordial being present primarily in the cosmological doctrine of the Tayyibi Isma'ilism. The Tenth Intellect is the last in a series of celestial immaterial Intellects—comprising a spiritual cosmos—that governs and sustains the physical cosmos.

== Cosmogony: Drama in Heaven ==
In the Tayyibi Ismaili cosmogony, known as the "drama in heaven", the transcendent Originator (al-mubdi) originated a number of primordial originated beings equal in rank and capacity. One of these originated beings realized it had been created by God and began to worship its originator, and was thus called the First Intellect (al-mubda al-awwal) reigning over the spiritual cosmos. Other originated beings were ranked by how quickly they followed the example of this First Intellect, and the second and third Intellects competed for the second rank. The second originated being succeeded and emerged as the Second Intellect. The third originated being refused to accept this prioritization of the Second Intellect and committed the first "sin," thus falling from third rank to tenth rank in the hierarchy of archangelic Intellects. After realizing its error and repenting, this Tenth Intellect emerged to govern and sustain a physical cosmos filled with its own spiritual members—other fallen souls—that had equally failed to recognize the preeminence of the Second Intellect.

To regain its original position, the Tenth Intellect attempts to convince other fallen beings to repent and begins the da'wah on earth. With the support of its followers, the Tenth Intellect combats the darkness of Iblis as it climbs through cycles of time back to redemption on the Day of Resurrection (Qiyama). The first representative of the Spiritual Adam's earthly da'wah was the Universal Adam (Adam al-Kulli), the first and primordial Imam, who then took the place of the Spiritual Adam at the Tenth Intellect at the end of the initial earthly time cycle, thus elevating the Spiritual Adam one step closer to redemption and to its former position. Neither of these two Adams should be confused with the historical Adam of the Bible or the Quran (Adam al-Safi), who is described as being merely a Partial Adam (Adam al-Juz'i) responsible for inaugurating the current time cycle approximately 6,000 years ago.

== Historical origins: Hamid al-Din al-Kirmani, Ibraham al-Hamidi and non-Islamic influences ==
The Tayyibi system of ten Intellects is adopted from the ten Intellects of the Fatimid da’i Hamid al-Din al-Kirmani, in a departure from Fatimid cosmological Neoplatonism. However, in Kirmani's system, the First Intellect emanates two beings: the Second Intellect and the Potential Intellect, which is primordial Matter and Form. The Second Intellect emanates eight other Intellects in successive emanation, while the nine spheres of the Aristotelian cosmos proceed from the activities of each of the Intellects upon the Potential Intellect. The Potential Intellect—an emanation of the First Intellect subordinate in rank to the Second Intellect—is responsible for the physical world. Tatsuya Kikuchi suggests that this Potential Intellect is probably not equivalent to the Tayyibi Tenth Intellect, and the Tenth Intellect in Kirmani's system does not maintain any special significance above the other separate intellects. The second Tayyibi da’i mutlaq, Ibrahim al-Hamidi, introduced a more mythical, gnostic, mystical “drama in heaven” into Tayyibi doctrine. He launched a new stage of medieval Tayyibi and Ismaili cosmology wherein the Tenth Intellect takes on special significance, although he is not singularly responsible for this evolution- he did not introduce or utilize the terms “Universal Adam” and “Partial Adam,” for example.

In addition to the influences of Kirmani and Hamidi, there are also traces of earlier Zoroastrian and Manichaean ideologies present in the Tayyibi understanding of the Tenth Intellect. For example, the souls of initiates into the da’wah are attached to particles of light, and through time, these particles join into a temple of light, the imamate, and at the end of each time cycle the last imam rises with his temple of light (as the Universal Adam did) and takes the place of the Tenth Intellect. This understanding of light as affiliated with spiritual ascent is reminiscent of Manichaean cosmology. Further, as Henry Corbin asserts, there may be a connection between the Spiritual Adam and the Zoroastrian divinity Zurvan, who engendered Ahura Mazda and Angra Mainyu and who strays from pure goodness into an opacity between good and evil, light and dark, in a fashion similar to the fall of the Tenth Intellect.

== See also ==
- Al-Farabi
- Encyclopedia of the Brethren of Purity
- Al-Mu'ayyad fi'l-Din al-Shirazi
- Al-Qadi al-Nu'man
