= Diplomatic Quarter General Authority =

Planning authority that administered Riyadh's Diplomatic Quarter between 2018 and 2021

- الهيئة العامة لحي السفارات

Agency overview
- Formed: November 27, 2018
- Dissolved: January 26, 2021
- Jurisdiction: Government of Saudi Arabia
- Headquarters: Tuwaiq Palace, 2664 Alhattan Street, Diplomatic Quarter, Riyadh 12513, Saudi Arabia
- Agency executive: Fahd bin Hussain bin Mushait, CEO
- Website: dqga.gov.sa

The Diplomatic Quarter General Authority (DQGA; Arabic: الهيئة العامة لحي السفارات), often shortened to Diplomatic Quarter Authority, was a short-lived planning authority that administered the Diplomatic Quarter district in Riyadh, Saudi Arabia between November 2018 and January 2021, independent from the supervision of Riyadh Municipality.

== History ==
The Diplomatic Quarter General Authority was established on November 27, 2018, through the Council of Ministers decision No. (165). In December 2018, the Council of Ministers outlined the organizational structure of the newly created authority, stipulating that the body would be bestowed with a financial and administrative independence besides being led by a board of directors and would responsible for its urban, cultural, social and historical development. In July 2019, the authority launched a blood donation campaign jointly with King Saud University in the Diplomatic Quarter. The DQGA organized the 'First Tuwaiq International Sculpture Gathering' in March 2019, in which countries like Italy, Albania, Germany, Bulgaria and Japan took part. In October 2019, the DQGA signed a strategic partnership agreement with a real estate development company in Saudi Arabia in order to build a commercial and entertainment complex. In November 2019, the DQGA signed a partnership agreement with the Saudi Golf Federation for the establishment of a golf course in the Diplomatic Quarter. In May 2020, DQGA signed a strategic partnership agreement with Dr. Sulaiman Al Habib Medical Group for the construction of a medical facility which would be developed and operated in the district. In July 2020, the DQGA signed a partnership with Tawal company for developing the infrastructure of the telecommunications sector in the district. In January 2021, the Council of Ministers passed a resolution which abolished the Diplomatic Quarter General Authority, whereby transferring its responsibilities to the Royal Commission for Riyadh City.

== List of executives ==
Name	Position	In office
Dr. Fahd bin Hussain bin Mushait	CEO	November 27, 2018 – January 26, 2021
