= Irqah Sub-Municipality =

Irqah Sub-Municipality بلدية عرقة
- Baladiyah
- Country: Saudi Arabia
- City: Riyadh
- Website: irqah.alriyadh.gov.sa

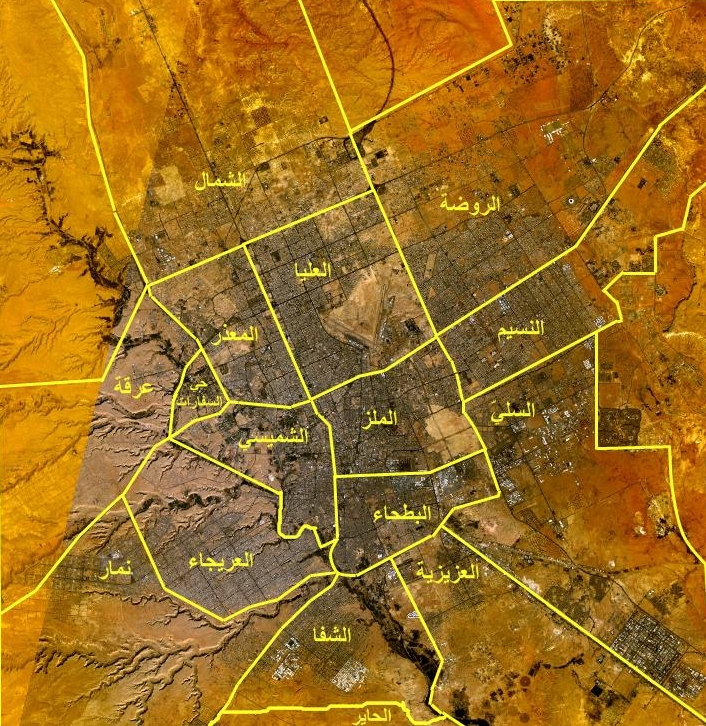
Map of Riyadh showing municipal boundaries and urban layout

Irqah Sub-Municipality (Arabic: بلدية عرقة), is one of the 16 baladiyahs of Riyadh, Saudi Arabia. Since the emancipation of the Diplomatic Quarter district from its jurisdiction in November 2018, it includes 4 neighborhoods and is responsible for their planning and development.
