= Ashraf Fagih =

Author and academic

- أشرف فقيه
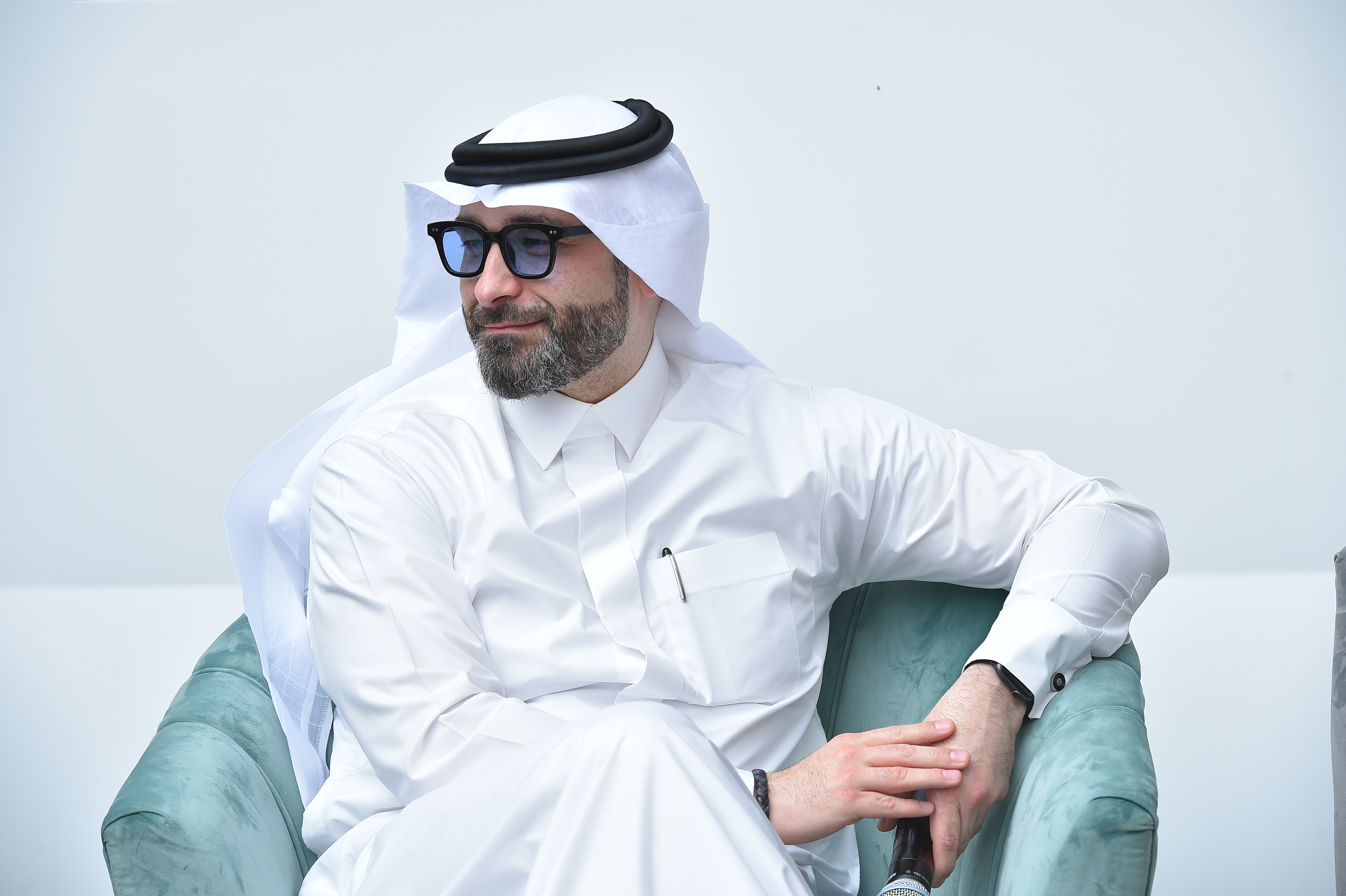
- Fagih in Art Dubai, 2019
- Born: September 19, 1977 (age 49)
- Education: Queen's University Ph.D. Texas A&M University MCS; King Fahd University of Petroleum & Minerals B.Sc.
- Occupations: Novelist; Short-story writer; Translator
- Writing career
- Language: Arabic
- Years active: 1997–present
- Genres: Science fiction Historical fiction
- Notable work: A Portrait of the Void - رسم العدم

Ashraf E. Fagih (Pronounced: "Fa-geeh") (Arabic: أشرف إحسان فقيه) is a Saudi novelist and academic. He is one of the few notable science fiction authors in the Arab states of the Persian Gulf.

== Education ==
Ashraf holds an undergraduate degree (with Honors) in Computer Engineering from King Fahd University of Petroleum & Minerals, a master's degree in Computer Science from Texas A&M University, and a PhD degree from Queen's University. His doctoral work explores performance and design issues related to hybrid wireless environments, such as the Internet of Things.

== Academic career ==
Between 2013 and 2018, he was an assistant professor with the Department of Information & Computer Science at King Fahd University of Petroleum & Minerals (KFUPM). He also served as the Supervisor of University Relations & Community Outreach, and as the deputy director of the Information Technology Center in KFUPM. Dr. Fagih taught many specialized courses according to variety of concepts, including Massive Open Online Courses (MOOC), where he offered the first-ever Arab course on a MOOC platform in October 2013.

== Writing ==
First published at the age of twenty, Fagih is noted for his writings in science fiction, historical fantasy, and mainstream culture.

Ashraf was the scientific editor of Al-Qafilah magazine between 2014 and 2017. He has been an invitee to numerous events on creative writing and the literature of science, including Ithra's Tanween Creativity Season and the World Science Fiction Convention (DisCon III).

== Bibliography ==
=== Novels ===
- The Philosopher – الفيلسوف. 2026. A historical narrative exploring the life of al-Kindi, the preeminent 9th-century Arab polymath. The novel depicts his pivotal role in Baghdad’s golden age through periods of political turbulence, focusing on his lifelong endeavor to integrate philosophical inquiry into the framework of Islamic thought. ISBN 978-9921-854-35-0.
- A Portrait of the Void – رسم العدم. 2020. A historical novel following the life of 13th century Pisan mathematician Leonardo Fibonacci, and his introduction of the Arabic Numerals to Europe. ISBN 9789921723700
- The Impaler – المُخوزِق. 2012. A historical thriller tracing the origins of Count Vlad Dracula's struggle against the Ottomans in the 15th century. ISBN 9782844096265, ASIN B07TTX6ZHQ

=== Novellas & Short story collections ===
- Three Chances – ثلاث فرص. 2016. Arabic science fiction novella. ASIN B08FDKKGM3
- Over Twenty Lives – نيّف وعشرون حياة. 2006. Arabic science fiction short stories. ISBN 9953449732, ASIN B09ZQVK4GV
- Longing to the Stars – حنيناً إلى النجوم. 2000. Arabic science fiction short stories. ISBN 9960364313
- The Ghosts’ Hunter – صائد الأشباح. 1997. Arabic science fiction short stories. ISBN 9960317218

=== Co-translations ===
- Wild Cards #1 - بطاقات جامحة. Arabic translation, published by Yatakhayaloon - 2021. ASIN B09NZVHL88
- Writing Tools: 50 Essential Strategies for Every Writer - أدوات الكتابة. Arabic translation, published by Takween - 2017. ISBN 9786140121560
