= Ian Richard Netton =

Professor of Islamic Studies

Ian Richard Netton is an Emeritus Professor of Islamic Studies at the University of Exeter. He is a Fellow of the Royal Asiatic Society of Great Britain and Ireland, Royal Historical Society and Royal Society of Arts.

== Biography ==
Netton was born in Singapore and received a BA in Arabic from the School of Oriental and African Studies at the University of London in 1972, as well as a PhD in Arabic and Islamic Studies from the University of Exeter in 1976, with an emphasis on in mediaeval Islamic philosophy.

He taught at Exeter University from 1977 to 1995, where he later became Reader in Arab and Islamic Civilization and Thought. He was appointed the University of Leeds' first Professor of Arabic Studies in September 1995 and he stayed there until 2007. From 1997 to 2002, he was Director of Leeds University's Centre for Medieval Studies. He became Sharjah Professor of Islamic Studies at Exeter University in 2007, and he is now Emeritus Professor of Islamic Studies.

== Works ==
- Allah Transcendent: Studies in the Structure and Semiotics of Islamic Philosophy, Theology and Cosmology
- Islam, Christianity and the Realms of the Miraculous: A Comparative Exploration
- Islam, Christianity and the Mystic Journey: A Comparative Exploration
- Islam, Christianity and Tradition: A Comparative Exploration
