= Mykhaylo Yakubovych =

Ukrainian academic

- Born: 26 November 1986; Ostrog, Ukrainian SSR, Soviet Union (now Ostroh, Ukraine)
- Education: National University of Ostroh Academy

Mykhaylo Mykhaylovych Yakubovych (Ukrainian: Михайло Михайлович Якубович, born 26 November 1986) is a translator and scholar of Islamic Studies from Ukraine, specializing in Qur’anic Studies, Medieval and Contemporary Islamic Thought, and the History of Islam in Ukraine.

== Early life and education ==
He received his PhD from the National University of Ostroh Academy where he worked as an Associate Professor and researcher in Islamic Studies. Honorary research fellow at Coventry University (UK). In 2020, moved to the University of Freiburg, Germany.

== Career ==
He conducted his research on the Medieval Islam during his fellowships in Poland (2008, 2009), Italy (2009, 2011), Saudi Arabia (2010) and United States (Princeton, Institute for Advanced Study, 2014). He published few books, numerous articles and translations in various scientific journals in Ukraine, Poland, Russia, Egypt, Saudi Arabia, the United Kingdom, and Turkey ("Religion, State and Society", "Journal of Ottoman Studies", "Yearbook of Muslims in Europe" etc.). He completed the first full translation of the Qur’an into the Ukrainian language, approved for publishing by the King Fahd Glorious Qur’an Printing Complex (Madinah, Kingdom of Saudi Arabia) and released in 2013 with a second edition in 2015 from Kyiv. He is a member of the research projects on the reception of the Arabic culture in Poland from 2013 to 2015 and 2016 to 2018 at Warsaw University.

== Bibliography ==
- The Qur'an: Ukrainian translation and commentaries by Mykhaylo Yakubovych. Madinah, 2013; Kyiv, 2015.
- Islam in Ukraine (Vinnytsia, 2016, in Ukrainian).
- Philosophical Thought of the Crimean Khanate (Kyiv, 2016, in Ukrainian).
- The Kingdom and the Qur’an. Translating the Holy Book of Islam in Saudi Arabia. Cambridge: Open Book Publishers, 2024.

== Some articles in English ==
- Mykhaylo Yakubovych. Islam in Ukraine (country report), Yearbook of Muslims in Europe, Volume 7, Leiden: Brill, 2016.
- Mykhaylo Yakubovych. Jan Latosz (1539–1608) and His Natural Philosophy: reception of Arabic science in early modern Poland, Cultures in Motion. Studies in the Medieval and Early Modern Periods. Ed. by Adam Izdebski and Damian Jasiński, Kraków: Jagiellonian University Press, 2014.
- Mykhaylo Yakubovych. Ukrainian Translations of the Meanings of the Glorious Qur'an: Problems and Prospects
- Mykhaylo Yakubovych. Islam and Muslims in Contemporary Ukraine: Common Backgrounds, Different Images, Religion, State and Society, 2010, No. 3.
- A Cultural Significance of the Modern Islamic Exegetics for the Theory of Religious Tolerance.
- Mykhaylo Yakubovych. Prophethood as a Historical Necessity: Between The Islamic Traditionalism and The Eastern Neoplatonism, Studia Antyczne i Mediewistyczne, No. 7 [42], 2009, P. 57-43.
- Mykhaylo Yakubovych. Muhammad al-Aqkirmānı and his ‘ Iqd al-La’ālı: The Reception of Ibn Sınā in Early Modern Ottoman Empire.
- A Neglected Ottoman Sufi Treatise from 16th century: Mawāhib al-Rahman f bayān Marātib al-Akwān by Ibrāhim al-Qirimi.
- Post-Classical Islamic Philosophy in the Medieval Crimea.
