= Deborah Black =

Canadian philosopher

- Born: 1958 (age 67–68)

Education
- Education: University of Toronto (BA, MA, PhD)
- Thesis: The Logical Dimensions of Rhetoric and Poetics: Aspects of Non-Demonstrative Reasoning in Medieval Arabic Philosophy (1987)
- Doctoral advisor: Michael E. Marmura; James P. Reilly

Philosophical work
- Era: 21st-century philosophy
- Region: Western philosophy
- Institutions: University of Toronto
- Main interests: Islamic philosophy

Deborah Black (born 1958) is a Canadian philosopher and Professor of Philosophy at the University of Toronto. She is known for her works on Islamic philosophy.

== Books ==
- Logic and Aristotle's Rhetoric and Poetics in Medieval Arabic Philosophy, Leiden: E. J. Brill, 1990
