= Ibn al-Tayyib =

11th-century writer, priest and polymath of the Church of the East

Abū al-Faraj ʿAbd Allāh ibn al-Ṭayyib (Note: Also transliterated Abū l-Faraj ʿAbdallāh ibn al‑Ṭayyib, Abu ʾl-Faradj ʿAbd Allāh ibn al‑Ṭayyib or Ibn aṭ-Ṭaiyib. Ibn al‑Ṭayyib's name has sometimes been mixed up with that of the scribe ʿAbdallāh ibn ʿAlī ibn Abī ʿĪsā al-Shammās al-ʿIbādī, who may have been his secretary.) (died 1043), known by the nisba al-ʿIrāqī (Note: Also spelled al-ʿIrāḳī. This nisba is not found in medieval sources.) and in medieval Latin as Abulpharagius Abdalla Benattibus, (Note: Pedro Gallego in the 13th century called him Abenfarag.) was a prolific writer, priest and polymath of the Church of the East. (Note: He is often called a Nestorian.) He practised medicine in Baghdad and wrote in Arabic about medicine, canon law, theology and philosophy. His biblical exegesis remains the most influential written in Arabic and he was an important commentator on Galen and Aristotle. He also produced translations from Syriac into Arabic.

== Life ==
According to Ibn al-ʿAdīm, he was born in Antioch but no other source reports this and it is often assumed that he was born in Iraq. Ibn al-Ṭayyib studied medicine and probably philosophy under Abū al-Khayr ibn Suwār ibn al-Khammār. Some modern authors also make him a student of Abū ʿAlī ʿĪsā ibn Zurʿa. He taught and practised medicine at the hospital (al-māristān) al-ʿAḍudī in Baghdad. (Note: This hospital was founded by the Emir ʿAḍud al-Dawla (978–983).) Ibn Buṭlān, ʿAlī ibn ʿĪsā al-Kaḥḥāl and Abū al-Ḥusayn al-Baṣrī were among his pupils. The main source for his medical career is Ibn Abī Uṣaybiʿa's biographical dictionary.

Ibn al-Ṭayyib held the office of patriarchal secretary (kātib al-jāthalīq) under two patriarchs of the Church of the East, Yūḥannā ibn Nāzūk (1012/13–1020/22) and Eliya I (1028–1049), and was responsible for the synod that elected Eliya. As secretary to the latter, he approved the apologetic work of Eliya of Nisibis. According to Bar Hebraeus, writing in the 13th century, he was a monk, but this is difficult to square with his career as a physician. There are hints that Ibn al-Ṭayyib suffered a nervous breakdown from intellectual strain. His contemporary, Ibn Sīnā, seems to have heard about it.

There is some uncertainty about the date of Ibn al‑Ṭayyib's death. According to al-Qifṭī, writing early in the 13th century, he died between AH 420 and 435, that is, between January 1029 and July 1044. According to Bar Hebraeus, he died in the month of first Tishrīn in the year 1355 of the Seleucid era, which corresponds to October 1043. Writing the 14th century, Ṣalībā ibn Yūḥannā places his burial in AH 434, that is, between August 1042 and August 1043. He records that he was buried in the chapel of the monastery Dayr Durtā.

After his death, a debate took place in Cairo between his student Ibn Buṭlān and ʿAlī ibn Riḍwān concerning whether a medical student should learn only through books or through teachers as well. Ibn Buṭlān defended the role of his teacher.

== Works ==
Over forty works written by Ibn al-Ṭayyib have been identified and all are written in Arabic. Besides his knowledge of Syriac and Arabic, he may have known some Greek.

Samir Khalil Samir notes that in all his works in every genre, Ibn al-Ṭayyib always structures his introduction or prologue in the same way as a series of answers to seven implicit questions: who wrote it, to whom, for what purpose, etc.

=== Exegesis ===
Ibn al-Ṭayyib "remains the foremost biblical exegete in Arabic" who produced "the greatest exegetical collections of Christian Arabic literature". He wrote a compendious biblical commentary, Firdaws al-naṣrāniyya (Paradise of Christianity), drawing heavily on Syriac sources, such as the Scholion of Theodore bar Koni, the Selected Questions of Ishoʿ bar Nun and the commentaries of Ishoʿdad of Merv and Moshe bar Kepha. This work circulated widely and brought the Coptic and Ethiopian churches into contact with the exegetical tradition of the Church of the East. In Ethiopia, it was translated into Ge'ez and subsequently into Amharic. It was highly influential on the Amharic Andemta commentaries.

Besides the Firdaws, he wrote separate commentaries on the Psalms and the Gospels. For the former, he translated the Psalms from the Syriac Peshitta into Arabic. He started a commentary on the Pauline and general epistles, but it is now lost. The three separate commentaries seem to have been abridged for incorporation into the Firdaws. Although his exegetical works are the longest he wrote on religious topics, they are still largely unedited and unpublished. Only the commentary on Genesis in the Firdaws has seen a critical edition. The opening section of the introduction of the Firdaws is lost.

Ibn al-Ṭayyib's exegesis belongs to the traditions of the school of Antioch, emphasising literal, moral and historical interpretation. According to the introduction to his commentary on the Gospels, his goal was the preservation of the Syriac exegetical tradition in Arabic. This seems to have been a motivation in all his exegetical writing. To that end, he was a compiler and synthesist more than an original interpreter. When he relies on Greek fathers like Theodore of Mopsuestia and John Chrysostom, he appears to be drawing from other compilations.

=== Theology and canon law ===
Ibn al-Ṭayyib wrote over a dozen treatises on theology. His theological magnum opus was Maqāla fī l-usūl al-dīniyya (Treatise on Religious Principles). It is lost, although a description of its contents survives. Al-Muʾtaman ibn al-ʿAssāl records that he wrote a fourteen-chapter systematic theology (possibly the Maqāla) and a treatise on christology, the Kitāb al-ittiḥād. Despite his proximity to Muslims, Ibn al-Ṭayyib never mentions Islam in his theological works. A desire to defend against Islamic accusations of tritheism may lie behind his emphasis on the unity of the Trinity.

He held to the traditional theology of the Church of the East and wrote a Refutation of Those Who Say that Mary is the Mother of God, denying Mary, mother of Jesus, the title of Theotokos. He also wrote a defence of theological rationalism in Qawl fī l-ʿilm wa-l-muʿjiza (Treatise on Science and Miracle).

He wrote a treatise on the canon law of the Church of the East, Fiqh al-naṣrāniyya (Law of Christianity). This compilation cited canons from the ecumenical councils Nicaea and Chalcedon, from the councils of the Church of the East as collected by Patriarch Timothy I and from later councils down to his own day. He also made extensive use of the late 9th-century Syriac legal collection of Gabriel of Baṣra. The work was organized thematically. Topics include betrothals, marriages, guardianship, taxes, debts, deeds and inheritance. The importance of these topics lay in the fact that the Christian dhimma was permitted to judge these matters among themselves, but errors could lead to lawsuits taken to Islamic courts. He also wrote a short "Response to an Enquiry about the Ending of Marriages and Divorce".

Ibn al-Ṭayyib is probably responsible for the Arabic translation of the Syriac Diatessaron of Tatian.

=== Philosophy ===
In philosophy, Ibn al-Ṭayyib was an Aristotelian, albeit influenced heavily by the Neoplatonists Porphyry, Ammonius Hermiae, Olympiodorus the Younger, Simplicius of Cilicia, John Philoponus and Elias. He is sometimes regarded as the last in a long Christian Aristotelian tradition in Baghdad following Ḥunayn ibn Isḥāq, Isḥāq ibn Ḥunayn, Mattā ibn Yūnus and Yaḥyā ibn ʿAdī. The Muslim philosophers Ibn Sīnā (Avicenna) and Ibn Rushd (Averroes) and the Jewish philosopher Maimonides were all acquainted with his philosophy.

He wrote commentaries on the entire Organon of Aristotle, but only that on the Categories has survived in full and only an abstract of the commentary on the Posterior Analytics survives. He also wrote a commentary on the Isagoge of Porphyry, which was itself an introduction to the Categories. Taken all together, this Aristotelian project seems to have been designed as a curriculum for teaching logic. His commentaries are not particularly original. In structure and content they follow closely the commentaries of Olympiodorus. He is more systematic than his models, endeavouring to build an Aristotelian system exclusively from the texts of Aristotle. His interpretations of Aristotle never derive from other commentators but always exclusively from the Aristotelian texts.

Ibn al-Ṭayyib's commentary on the Metaphysics, mentioned by Ibn Buṭlān, is lost. Notes from his lectures on Aristotle's Physics were kept by al-Baṣrī. Although these are mostly just summaries of Aristotle's arguments, Ibn al-Ṭayyib differed from Aristotle in arguing that the First Mover's first movement must have been an act of creation. Ibn al-Ṭayyib's commentary on the History of Animals survives only in a Hebrew translation, which was popular among the Jews of medieval Spain. Only a few questions are preserved from the original work in Arabic. It evidently relied on Ḥunayn ibn Isḥāq's revision of Aristotle's text. It was cited as a source by Pedro Gallego in his Book of Animals in the 13th century.

Ibn al-Ṭayyib epitomised and paraphrased the Laws of Plato, although he was working from a synopsis of Plato, either Galen's or al-Fārābī's. A lecture on Aristotelian economics is attributed to Ibn al-Ṭayyib. He also wrote some ethical treatises, including a commentary on the Arabic translation of the Tabula Cebetis of Ibn Miskawayh. He also translated the pseudo-Aristotelian On Virtues and Vices from Syriac.

=== Medicine ===
Ibn al-Ṭayyib wrote several medical treatises, including commentaries on Hippocrates and Galen.

He wrote commentaries called thimār on the sixteen collected volumes of Galen known as the Summaria Alexandrinorum, which formed the basis of the curriculum in the medical school of Alexandria. Risāla fī l-Quwā al-ṭabīʿīya, his commentary on Galen's On the Natural Forces, prompted a rebuttal by Ibn Sinā and the two works were often copied together.
