= Allīnūs =

Marginal note from Allīnūs framed in red. His name is in red in the top right corner.

Allīnūs or Alīnūs (Arabic: اللينوس, romanized: ʾllynws) was an Alexandrian philosopher and commentator on Aristotle from the sixth or seventh century AD. He wrote in Greek, but is known only from Arabic sources, including some translated excerpts of his works.

== Life ==
Allīnūs was a Greek from Alexandria. Ibn Abī Uṣaybiʿa calls him al-Iskandarānī, 'the Alexandrian', and al-Qifṭī, in his commentary on the Kitāb al-Fihrist of Ibn al-Nadīm, qualifies him as a "Byzantine". Since he commented on the writings of Porphyry, he must have lived no earlier than the fourth century AD, most probably in the sixth or seventh. According to both Ibn al-Khammār and Ibn al-Ṭayyib, he belonged to a "group of Alexandrian philosophers" that followed John Philoponus and Olympiodorus the Younger. Probably, like the philosopher Elias, he was a pupil of Olympiodorus.

The Greek name of Allīnūs is not known and the Arabic spelling varies in the manuscripts. There are at least six variants. It has been suggested that the name is Aelianus, Albinus, Apollonius or Elias. An identification with the philosopher Elias has been ruled out. A possible identification is with the Apollonius of Alexandria cited by Simplicius of Cilicia in his commentary on the Categories, but nothing is known about this Apollonius, including when he lived.

== Works ==
Fragments of Allīnūs commentaries or citations of them are found in several works. In total, there are eighteen surviving excerpts, either verbatim quotations or paraphrases, attributed to Allīnūs. In addition, there are four sayings of Allīnūs collected in the Ṣiwān al-ḥikmah of Abū Sulaymān al-Manṭiqī al-Sijistānī. All excerpts and sayings have been translated into English by Franz Rosenthal.

=== Commentaries ===
According to al-Qifṭī, Allīnūs wrote commentaries on the "four books" of logic, which means Aristotle's Categories, Hermeneutics and Prior Analytics and Porphyry's Isagoge.

Ibn al-Khammār was an admirer of Allīnūs. Ibn Abī Uṣaybiʿa writes that he saw, in a list of Ibn al-Khammār's works in his own handwriting, a translation from Syriac into Arabic of a work by Allīnūs entitled Arrangement of the Isagoge and the Categories. Ibn al-Khammār not only translated the commentary, but also provided his own commentary on the Arrangement in the form of marginal notes. In his course on the Categories, Ibn al-Khammār used the Arabic translation of Yaḥyā ibn ʿAdī, but it is most likely he relied on the commentary of Allīnūs.

Ibn al-Maṭrān cites both Allīnūs's commentaries on the Isagoge and the Categories. Ibn al-Ṭayyib also cites Allīnūs in his own commentaries on the Isagoge and the Categories. According to Ibn Riḍwān, Allīnūs criticized Aristotle in his comments on the fifth section of the Hermeneutics. Three quotations from Allīnūs are found in the Kitāb al-Saʿdāh wa-l-isʿād of Abu ʾl-Ḥasan ibn Abī Dharr. The manuscript Paris, Bibliothèque nationale de France, Ar. 2346, a copy of Ibn al-Khammār, contains marginal glosses by Allīnūs that seem to come from a different work than the Arrangement. Several further glosses either quoting or paraphrasing Allīnūs are included in the Arabic critical editions of Aristotle and the Isagoge by the Egyptian philosophers ʿAbd al-Raḥmān Badawī and Aḥmad Fuʾād al-Ahwānī, respectively.

=== Sayings ===
Of the four sayings attributed in the Ṣiwān to Allīnūs, one is an apocryphal saying attributed by Philostratus to Apollonius of Tyana. This strengthens the view that Allīnūs's Greek name was Apollonius. The other sayings attributed to Allīnūs are:

- He was asked, "Why are you always sceptical?" He replied, "For the defence of certainty."
- He said: I wonder how a weak lamp between four violent winds can remain.
  This is glossed by the Ṣiwān with "That is, the soul in its relation to those four elements."
- He said: There are four fires: A fire that eats and drinks—the fire of the stomach. A fire that eats but does not drink—the fire of fuel. A fire that drinks but does not eat—the fire of trees. And a fire that neither eats nor drinks—the fire of stones.

== Bibliography ==
- Elamrani-Jamal, Abdelali (1994). "Alīnūs (Allīnūs)". Dictionnaire des philosophes antiques. Vol. 1. Centre National de la Recherche Scientifique. pp. 151–152.
- Gutas, Dimitri (2010). "Greek Philosophical Works Translated into Arabic". In Robert Pasnau; Christina Van Dyke (eds.). The Cambridge History of Medieval Philosophy. Vol. 2. Cambridge University Press. pp. 802–814.
- Gutas, Dimitri (2017). "The Rebirth of Philosophy and the Translations into Arabic". In Ulrich Rudolph; Rotraud Hansberger; Peter Adamson (eds.). Philosophy in the Islamic World. Vol. 1: 8th–10th Centuries. Translated by Rotraud Hansberger. Brill. pp. 85–142.
- Gyekye, Kwame, ed. (1979). Arabic Logic: Ibn Ibn al-Ṭayyib's Commentary on Porphyry's Eisagoge. SUNY Press.
- Kraemer, Joel L. (1992). Humanism in the Renaissance of Islam: The Cultural Revival During the Buyid Age (2nd rev. ed.). Brill.
- Martini Bonadeo, Cecilia (2011). "Ibn Suwār (Ibn al-Khammār)". In Henrik Lagerlund (ed.). Encyclopedia of Medieval Philosophy. Springer. pp. 527–528. doi:10.1007/978-1-4020-9729-4_233. ISBN 978-1-4020-9728-7. S2CID 243730923.
- Morewedge, Parviz (2014). "Translation of Greek and Persian Texts into Arabic". In İbrahim Kalın (ed.). The Oxford Encyclopedia of Philosophy, Science, and Technology in Islam. Oxford University Press. ISBN 978-0-19-981257-8.
- Rosenthal, Franz (1972). "A Commentator of Aristotle". In S. M. Stern; Albert Hourani; Vivian Brown (eds.). Islamic Philosophy and the Classical Tradition: Essays Presented by His Friends and Pupils to Richard Walzer on His Seventieth Birthday. University of South Carolina Press. pp. 337–349. ISBN 9780872492714.
- Walzer, Richard (1962). "New Light on the Arabic Translations of Aristotle". Greek into Arabic: Essays on Islamic Philosophy. Harvard University Press. pp. 60–113. Originally published in Oriens 6 (1953): 91ff.
