= Pseudo-Elias =

- Ἠλίας
- An excerpt of the Commentary below the text of the Isagoge. The text begins with an ascription to Elias: τοῦ ἠλία
- Born: fl. c. 600
- Other names: Pseudo-David

Philosophical work
- Era: Late antiquity
- Region: Ancient Greek philosophy
- School: Neoplatonism
- Institutions: University of Constantinople
- Language: Ancient Greek
- Main interests: Ancient Greek medicine, Logic
- Notable works: Commentary on Porphyry's Isagoge

Pseudo-Elias (fl. c. 600?), also called Pseudo-David, was the author of a set of lectures on logic written in Ancient Greek that form a commentary on Porphyry's Isagoge. The commentary, except for the first seven lectures, survives in a number of medieval manuscripts.

== Identity ==
The manuscripts identify the author of the commentary variously as either Elias or David, two other Neoplatonist commentators on Aristotle. However, modern scholars doubt these ascriptions based on comparisons to those authors' other extant works, and so the author is generally known as Pseudo-Elias or Pseudo-David.

The author of the commentary was probably active at Constantinople, or possibly Thessaloniki, some time before the closure of the University of Constantinople in 726, but probably closer to 600, and no earlier than the late sixth century, after Olympiodorus and Elias. Based on the name attributed to him, and the historical adoption of Neoplatonism by Christian philosophers in the Byzantine empire in the late 7th century, the author is generally identified as a Christian.

Although he was not working in Alexandria or Athens, he may have been educated in Alexandria or by an Alexandrian, as the work shows the influence of the school of Ammonius Hermiae. He may also have been a student of Stephanus of Alexandria, and some scholars have even identified Stephanus as the author of the Commentary.

Modern scholars have debated the relationship between Pseudo-Elias and the three other extant Neoplatonic commentaries on the Isagoge that were written by Ammonius, Elias, and David. Miroslav Marcovich argues that Elias depends on Ammonius, David on Elias and Ammonius, and Pseudo-Elias on Elias and David. Christian Wildberg also accepts Pseudo-Elias's dependence on both Elias and David. Henry Blumenthal, however, argues that Pseudo-Elias depends only on Elias and that David in turn depends on him.

Some modern scholars have suggested that the author was a physician by profession giving introductory lectures on logic, given that although the philosophical content of the work is rather weak, the author demonstrates special interest in Ancient Greek medicine and especially in the writings of Galen.

== Lectures on Porphyry's Isagoge ==
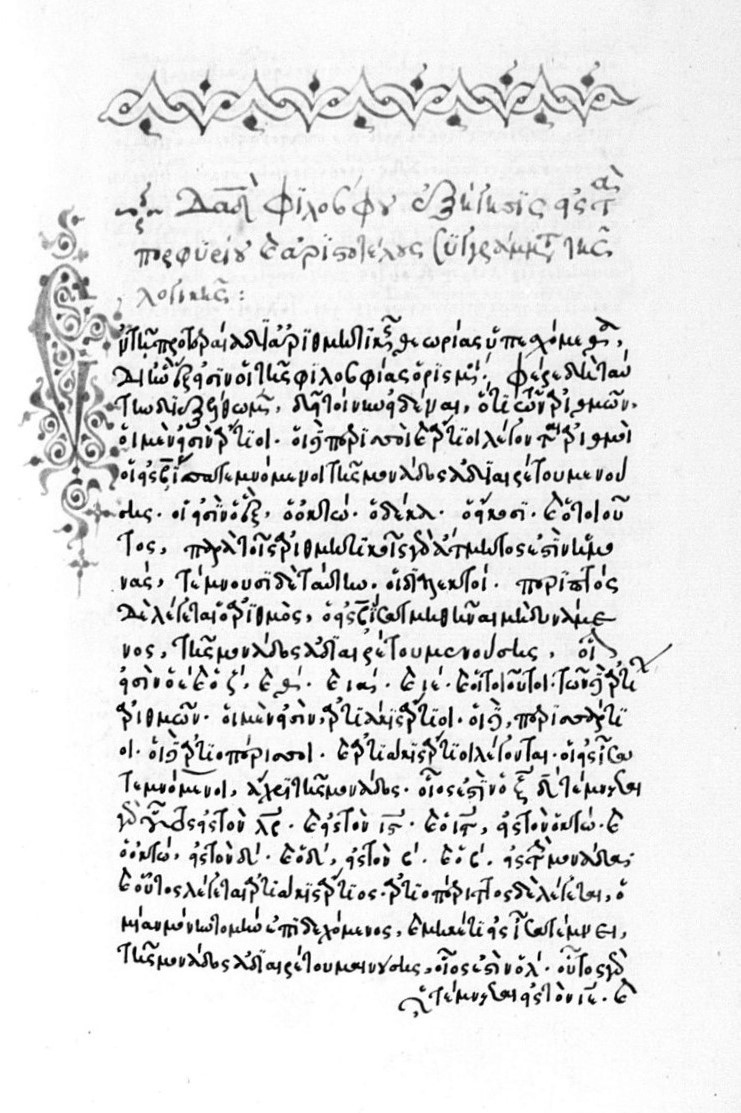
The start of the Commentary in the Munich manuscript, ascribed to Δα(υὶ)δ (David)

The Commentary is divided into 51 lectures, which can be divided into three sections:

- Lectures 1-23, of which the first seven are missing in all manuscripts, form the prolegomena to philosophy.
- Lectures 24-27 are a prolegomena to the Isagoge
- Lectures 28-51 form the commentary proper.

The division of the work into separate lectures follows the practice common to Neoplatonic commentaries following Olympiodorus, and the content of both introductions and the commentary itself are "substantially the same" as in David's Commentary on the Isagoge, but the commentary itself is the most original part of the work.

As philosophy, the commentary is rather weak. The weakness of the argumentation may, in some cases, be the fault of the transcriptionist who recorded the lectures, but the misunderstandings of Aristotle and ignorance of Plato belong to the lecturer.

== Manuscript tradition ==
Three manuscripts of the sixteenth century contain almost the complete text, minus the first seven lectures. These fuller copies name the philosopher David, which may be a guess of the scribes based on style.

- Paris, Bibliothèque nationale de France, Grec 1939, at folios 24^{r}–113^{r}
- Munich, Bayerische Staatsbibliothek, gr. 399, at folios 162^{r}–268^{r}
- Turin, Biblioteca Nazionale Universitaria, C. II. 7 (gr. 108), at folios 9^{r}–138^{r}

Two manuscripts of the fourteenth century contain excerpts, which may have been made from complete texts that were not missing the first seven lectures. These manuscripts name the author as Elias.

- Vienna, Österreichische Nationalbibliothek, Cod. Phil. gr. 139
- Paris, Bibliothèque nationale de France, Grec 1845

== Bibliography ==
- Blumenthal, H. J. (1981). "Pseudo-Elias and the Isagoge Commentaries Again". Rheinisches Museum für Philologie. Neue Folge. 124 (2): 188–192. JSTOR 41245044.
- Dickson, Keith (2008). "Stephanos of Alexandria (ca 580? – 640? CE)". In Paul T. Keyser; Georgia L. Irby-Massie (eds.). The Encyclopedia of Ancient Natural Scientists: The Greek Tradition and Its Many Heirs. Routledge. pp. 759–760.
- Marcovich, Miroslav (1975). "Pseudo-Elias on Heraclitus". The American Journal of Philology. 96 (1): 31–34. JSTOR 293589.
- Mueller-Jourdan, Pascal, ed. (2007). Une initiation à la philosophie de l'antiquité tardive: les leçons du Pseudo-Elias. Academic Press Fribourg.
- Westerink, L. G., ed. (1967). Pseudo-Elias (Pseudo-David): Lectures on Porphyry's Isagoge. North-Holland.
- Wildberg, Christian (1990). "Three Neoplatonic Introductions to Philosophy: Ammonius, David and Elias". Hermathena (149): 33–51. JSTOR 23041172.
