= Elias (Greek scholar) =

6th-century Greek scholar

Elias (/ɪˈlaɪəs/; Ancient Greek: Ἠλίας; fl. 6th century) was a Greek scholar and a commentator on Aristotle and Porphyry.

== Life ==
No information has been handed down about the life of Elias; all assumptions represented in the research are deductions from circumstantial evidence in his works. That he was at least nominally a Christian is inferred from his Christian name, but has not been proven conclusively. His thinking is influenced by Neoplatonism, the dominant philosophical direction in late antiquity.

Numerous passages in writings, some of which are certain, some of which are assumed to be by Elias, correspond to passages in the works of Olympiodorus the Younger. Olympiodorus was a prominent pagan philosopher who taught in the Neoplatonic school of Alexandria in the late-6th century. It is therefore reasonable to assume that Elias also lived and taught in Alexandria and that he was a student of Olympiodorus. However, the assumption that Olympiodorus was the head (scholarch) of the school and that Elias succeeded him in this office is speculative. Elias' probable participation in Olympiodorus's lessons gives an approximate chronological classification of his philosophical activity, because Olympiodorus is last attested to be alive in the year 565.

Elias bore the title apo epárchōn (apoeparch, former eparch). Since the term eparch was often used for high administrative officials, it has been assumed that the philosopher was identical with an eparch (praetorian prefect) of Illyria of the same name, who held the office in 541. In the Eastern Roman Empire, however, the title of apoeparch was also given to scholars on an honorary basis; hence the implication that Elias exercised office is not compelling.

== Works ==
The works of Elias were probably not intended for publication by him. As with many late antique writings of this type, these are at least partly unauthorized transcripts by students from his lessons. With this assumption, the following works attributed to him are considered genuine:

- Prolegomena to Philosophy, an anonymously transmitted introduction to the philosophy of Plato and Aristotle, consisting of twelve lessons (práxeis). It deals with the theory of definition and the definitions and divisions of philosophy. The Prolegomena have the character of a Protrepticus, a writing inspired by Aristotle's Protrepticus encouraging philosophy. Elias emphasizes the Platonic idea that philosophy deifies man and enthusiastically praises philosophical activity, which he supports with quotations of Plato, Homer and other conventional authorities.
- An introduction and a commentary on the Isagoge of the Neoplatonist Porphyry. The work has been handed down anonymously, but is quoted in Byzantine scholia with the author's name Elias.
- Scholia on Aristotle's On Interpretation. Elias is handwritten as the author. The scholia are probably part of a lost commentary by Elias on this work by Aristotle.
- A commentary on Aristotle's Prior Analytics, of which only the beginning has survived. It is identified in the title as a student's note from Elias's class.
- An otherwise unknown commentary on the Posterior Analytics, mentioned by Elias at the end of his introduction to the Isagoge, which is either lost or not yet identified.

The following works may or may not be authentic:

- A commentary on the categories of Aristotle (explanation of the ten categories of philosophy) with an introduction to Aristotelian philosophy. In Alexandria it was customary to add such an introduction to a commentary on the Categories. This work has not only been handed down in Greek, but also in an incompletely preserved Armenian version, the beginning and end of which are missing in the only manuscript. While no author's name can be found in the Armenian manuscript, the work is referred to in the Greek tradition as a postscript from the lessons of the philosopher David, another Neoplatonist. Researchers disagree as to who wrote it. The editor, Adolf Busse, followed by a number of historians of philosophy, advocates an attribution to Elias; other researchers, including Ilsetraut Hadot, consider David to be the author. Another clue for the dating results from the fact that the work quotes a Categories commentary by John Philoponus, which was written in the first half of the 6th century.
- Anonymous Prolegomena to Platonic Philosophy. The unknown author belongs to the school of Olympiodorus the Younger; it may be one of his students - perhaps Elias, or a student of Elias.
- A commentary on the Isagoge attributed in the manuscript tradition partly to David and partly to Elias, but which in reality cannot have come from either of these two philosophers. The commentary has been conjectured that it may have been written by Stephen of Alexandria. The designation of the author as Pseudo-Elias has become common.
- On the Directions (Greek Peri hairéseōn), a commentary on Galen's De sectis, to which Elias may allude at one point in his Prolegomena to Philosophy. The reference is unclear and otherwise nothing is known about such a work by Elias. In any case, what is meant is not a writing about schools of philosophy.

== Philosophy ==
Elias's religious world view is unclear. Two difficulties stand in the way of its determination. First, it is uncertain whether relevant evidence can be used in the commentary on Aristotle's categories attributed to him, since the authenticity of the commentary is disputed. Secondly, it is likely that some clearly Christian comments in the Prolegomena to Philosophy are insertions (interpolations) that do not come from the author. Since the surviving text appears to contain such additions by a Christian, the authenticity of all Christian references in Elias's works is questionable. However, it is also possible that Christian comments, some of which are formulated polemically antipagan and contradict the rest of the content, were interspersed by the author himself, because in this way he wanted to protect himself against the suspicion of infidelity.

In any case, it is certain that the author of the commentary on categories, who may be identical to Elias, shares the conviction of the pagan Neoplatonists on the eternity of the world, and implicitly rejects the church's doctrine of the creation of the world in time and of the future end of the world. It can therefore be assumed that he was either pagan or only very superficially Christianized. The prolegomena to philosophy are also characterized by pagan thinking. Therefore, Christian Wildberg doubts even the existence of a philosopher named Elias; he suggests that the works attributed to Elias are by an unknown pagan Neoplatonist.

In the Isagoge Commentary, Elias claims that the idea that God is corporeal is not absurd. This statement, which sounds unusual and offensive for a Platonist as well as for a Christian, should not be understood to mean that Elias believed in a physical God. Rather, he only theoretically explored the possibility of a material God.

Historians from the Stanford Encyclopedia of Philosophy observe that

Moreover, Elias repeatedly emphasizes the Platonic-Neoplatonic conviction that the purpose of philosophy is the transformation or assimilation of a human being to the godhead, a genuinely Platonic ideal explicitly stated in the Theaetetus, (176A-B).
