= Stephanus of Alexandria =

Byzantine Neo-Platonic philosopher (c. 580–640)

Stephanus of Alexandria (Note: Also Stephanus Alexandrinus, Stephanos Alexandreus, Stephanos of Alexandria, Stephen of Alexandria.) (Greek: Στέφανος Αλεξανδρεύς; fl. c. 580 – c. 640) was a Byzantine philosopher and teacher who, besides philosophy in the Neo-Platonic tradition, also wrote on alchemy, astrology and astronomy. He was one of the last exponents of the Alexandrian academic tradition before the Islamic conquest of Egypt.

== Life ==
Stephanus studied at Alexandria, probably under Elias. He is often named alongside Elias and David as among the Christians of the school of Olympiodorus. According to John Moschus, he was teaching and writing commentaries in Alexandria in the 580s, where he was involved in the controversy over Monophysitism, apparently taking positions on both sides. John calls him a "sophist and philosopher".

Shortly after the accession of the Emperor Heraclius in 610, Stephanus moved to Constantinople, the capital of the empire, "thereby bridging late Alexandria and the medieval Byzantine world." Whether he was invited by the emperor is not known. He took up a position as "ecumenical professor" (oikoumenikos didaskalos) (Note: He is also celebrated as an "ecumenical master" in the alchemical tradition.) at the Imperial Academy teaching Plato, Aristotle, the quadrivium, (Note: Arithmetic, geometry, music and astronomy.) alchemy and astrology. Among his students were the philosopher known as Pseudo-Elias and Tychicus of Trebizond, the teacher of the Armenian polymath Anania Shirakatsi.

Many works are attributed to Stephanus, some falsely, most written at Constantinople. Agapius of Hierapolis, writing of the treaty between Heraclius and the Persian king Kavad II in 628, states that Stephanus was "famous among the philosophers at that time". Stephanus died sometime before the death of Heraclius in 641. His identification with Stephanus of Athens has been proposed, but is unlikely.

== Works ==
1. A commentary on Aristotle. Editions:

- Commentaria in Aristotelem Graeca ed. consilio et auctoritate Academiae litt. reg. Boruss., Berlin, Bd. XV
- Ioannes Philoponus de anima, ed. Michael Hayduck, 1897 p. 446-607 (see praef. p. V); Vol. XVIII/3
- Stephanus de interpretatione, ed. M. Hayduck, 1885 (Vol. XXI/2: Stephanus in artem rhetoricam is by a Byzantine Rhetor Stephanos of the 12th century).

2. A commentary on the Isagogue of Porphyry. Editions:

- Anton Baumstark, Aristot. b. den Syrern v. 5.-8. Jh., Vol. 1: Syr.-arab. Biographien des Aristot., syr. Kommentare z. Eisag.des Porph., Leipzig 1900, 181-210 (with a translation of the fragments of the commentary of Stephanos).

3. Astronomical and chronological works. Editions:

- Explanatio per propria exempla commentarii Theonis in tabulas manuales, Ed. Usener, De Stephano Al. p. 38-54 (= Kl. Schriften. III, 295–319).

4. Alchemical works. Scholars are divided as to whether or not these are authentic works of the same Stephen of Alexandria due to the style of writing. The translator, F. Sherwood Taylor accepts them as his. A compendium of alchemical texts including the poem De Chrysopoeia (On how to make gold) is extant in two manuscripts, Venice Cod. Marcianus 299 and Paris BNF 2327.

Editions:

- De magna et sacra arte, Ed. Julius Ludwig Ideler in Physici et medici Graeci minores II, Berlin 1842 (Reprinted Hakkert, Amsterdam 1963) p. 199-253. (Ideler used a faulty copy of the Marcianus)
- F. Sherwood Taylor, The alchemical works of S. of Al., in: Ambix, the Journal of the Society for the study of alchemy and early chemistry 1, London 1937, 116–139; 2, 1938, 38-49 (Taylor compared Ideler with the Marcianus and edited lessons 1-3 only; with English translation and commentary).
- Maria Papathanassiou, ed., Stephanos von Alexandreia und sein alchemistisches Werk, Athens, 2017. Complete critical edition of the Greek text with extensive study and commentary online here and posted on the author's Academia.edu page.

5. Astrological works.

- Opusculum apotelesmaticum, Ed. Usener in De Stephano Al. p. 17-32 (= Kl. Schrr. III, 266–289).

6. A horoscope of Muhammad and a prophecy of the rise of Islam attributed to Stephanus is apocryphal. It must date from after 775, since it mentions the Caliph al-Mahdi.
