= Ibn al-Khammar =

Abū al-Khayr al-Ḥasan ibn Suwār ibn Bābā ibn Bahnām, called Ibn al-Khammār (born 942), was an East Syriac Christian philosopher and physician who taught and worked in Baghdad. He was a prolific translator from Syriac into Arabic and also wrote original works of philosophy, ethics, theology, medicine and meteorology.

Ibn al-Khammār has an entry in the biographical dictionary of Ibn Abī Uṣaybiʿa. He was born in November or December 942 (c. AH 330) in Baghdad. He became a surgeon at the ʿAḍudī hospital in Baghdad, where he taught Ibn al-Ṭayyib and Ibn Hindū. According to Ẓahīr al-Dīn al-Bayhaqī, writing over a century later, Ibn al-Khammār spent his last years in Khwārizm and Ghazna, where he converted to Islam. His death can be dated in or after 1017.

The manuscript Arabe 2346 in the Bibliothèque nationale de France contains an Arabic translation of Aristotle's Organon copied from a copy made by Ibn al-Khammār, itself copied from a copy made by his teacher, Yaḥyā ibn ʿAdī. Arabe 2346 contains various scholia on the Organon by the philosophers of Baghdad, including some by Ibn al-Khammār. In the debates between the mutakallimūn (Islamic theologians) and the falāsifa (Islamic philosophers) concerning whether God was known by intuition or by inferential reasoning, Ibn al-Khammār took the side of the falāsifa. Most of his works are lost, but the titles of two are known: Maqāla fī l-tawḥīd wa-l-tathlīth (Treatise on the Unity and Trinity) and Kitāb al-tawfīq bayna arāʾ al-falāsifa wa-l-Naṣāra (Note: Or Kitāb al-wifāq bayna raʾy al-falāsifa wa-l-Naṣāra) (The Concordance of the Views of the Philosophers and the Christians). Nothing is known about them beyond what can be inferred from their titles.

Ibn al-Khammār translated from Syriac into Arabic the Categories, On Interpretation and Prior Analytics of Aristotle; the Isagoge and two books of the History of Philosophy of Porphyry; the Meteorological Phenomena of Theophrastus; and the Book of Allīnūs. His translations were praised by al-Tawḥīdī for their elegance.

Ibn al-Khammār was revered by his contemporaries. Ibn al-Nadīm, who knew him, praises him as a logician. ʿAlī ibn Riḍwān, the Egyptian physician, recorded that Sultan Maḥmūd of Ghazna kissed the ground before him out of respect. His fame was such that the philosopher Avicenna expressed an intention to meet him, which ultimately went unfulfilled.

== Editions ==
- Lettinck, Paul, ed. (1999). Aristotle's Meteorology and Its Reception in the Arab World: With an Edition and Translation of Ibn Suwār's Treatise on Meteorological Phenomena and Ibn Bājja's Commentary on the Meteorology. Leiden: Brill. pp. 315–382.

== Bibliography ==
- Kraemer, Joel L. (1992). Humanism in the Renaissance of Islam: The Cultural Revival During the Buyid Age (2nd rev. ed.). Brill.
- Martini Bonadeo, Cecilia (2011). "Ibn Suwār (Ibn al-Khammār)". In Henrik Lagerlund (ed.). Encyclopedia of Medieval Philosophy. Springer. pp. 527–528. doi:10.1007/978-1-4020-9729-4_233. ISBN 978-1-4020-9728-7.
- Teule, Herman G. B. (2010). "Ibn al-Khammār". In David Thomas; Alex Mallett (eds.). Christian–Muslim Relations: A Bibliographical History. Vol. 2 (900–1050). Brill. pp. 557–560.
