= Protrepticus (Aristotle) =

Philosophical work by Aristotle

Protrepticus (Ancient Greek: Προτρεπτικός) or, "Exhortation to Philosophy" (Ancient Greek: Φιλοσοφητέον) is a lost philosophical work written by Aristotle in the mid-4th century BCE. The work was intended to encourage the reader to study philosophy. Although the Protrepticus was one of Aristotle's most famous works in antiquity, it did not survive except in fragments and ancient reports from later authors, particularly from Iamblichus, who appears to quote large extracts from it, without attribution, alongside extracts from extant works of Plato, in the second book of his work on Pythagoreanism.

== Format ==
Like many of Aristotle's lost works, Protrepticus was likely written as a Socratic dialogue, in a similar format to the works of Plato. There is good evidence that several of the nineteen works that stand at the head of Diogenes' and Hesychius' lists were dialogues; it may be inferred with high probability, though not with certainty, that the others were so too, but Stobaeus, pp. 59, 61 infra, and Athenaeus, p. 61 infra, confirm its genuineness. The Historia Augusta furthermore says that another lost work, Cicero's Hortensius, was allegedly modeled after the Protrepticus and as the Hortensius, like many of Cicero's extant philosophical works, was known to be written as a dialogue, the Protrepticus was probably one too.

== Content ==
The main aim of the work was to convince its readers that they should do philosophy. According to Alexander of Aphrodisias, the argument put forth was that if someone denied that one should do philosophy, then, because whether or not one should do philosophy is itself a philosophical concern, this proves that one should do philosophy in order to investigate the answer. Alexander states that the work further investigates the nature of philosophical contemplation and argues that this is also the proper exercise of human beings.

== Legacy ==
Aristotle's protrepticus is likely the origin of the English word Protreptics, which means, “turning or converting someone to a specific end” used in a philosophical sense, a word hardly ever used except in specialized philosophical treatises.

== See also ==
- Clement of Alexandria

== Ancient sources ==
Large fragments of the Protrepticus are quoted by Iamblichus in the second book of his work On Pythagoreanism. A number of ancient reports on the Protrepticus survive in other works:

- Alexander of Aphrodisias, Commentary on Aristotle's Topics page 149, lines 9-15
- Historia Augusta, Volume II page 97 lines 20-22
- Stobaeus, Florilegium §4.32.25
- Olympiodorus the Younger, Commentary on Plato's Alcibiades page 144
- Boethius, The Consolation of Philosophy §3.8
- David (commentator), Prolegomena to Philosophy page 9, lines 2-12
- Elias (commentator), Prolegomena to Philosophy page 3 lines 17-23
- "Φιλοσοφειν". Suda Online.
- Aristoteles (1978). Anonymous Commentary on Aristotle's De Interpretatione: (Codex Parisinus Graecus 2064) (in German).

== Reconstructions and translations ==
Since the 19th century, when inquiry was initiated by Jakob Bernays (1863), several scholars have attempted to reconstruct the work. Attempted reconstructions include:

- A 1961 book by Ingemar Düring
- A 1964 book by Anton-Hermann Chroust
- 2015 Online edition by Hutchinson and Johnson
