= Apollonius of Alexandria =

Apollonius of Alexandria may refer to:

- Apollonius of Alexandria, winner of the Stadion race of the 218th Olympiad in AD 93
- Apollonius of Alexandria, philosopher cited by Simplicius, possibly identical to the philosopher Allīnūs
