= Abu Bishr Matta ibn Yunus =

Arab Christian philosopher (c.870–940)

Abū Bishr Mattā ibn Yūnus al-Qunnāʾī (Arabic: ﺍﺑﻮ ﺑﺸﺮ ﻣﺘﺎ ﺑﻦ ﻳﻮﻧﺲ القنائي; c. 870-20 June 940) was an Arab Christian philosopher who played an important role in the transmission of the works of Aristotle to the Islamic world. He is famous for founding the Baghdad school of Aristotelian philosophers and being the teacher of Alpharabius.

== Biography ==
Abu Bishr was trained at the dayr Qunnā monastery (hence the name "al-Qunnāʾī"), a Nestorian institution not far from Baghdad, which supplied the government of the Abbasid Caliphate with many high-ranking officials. He then taught in Baghdad where the Muslim philosopher Al Farabi and the Syriac Christian philosopher Yahya ibn Adi were among his pupils.

== Works ==
Abu Bishr is best known for his Arabic translations of Aristotle and of his Greek commentators. Most of these translations were made from Syriac to Arabic but the famous Arabic bibliography Kitab al-Fihrist mentions a translation of Aristotle's Sophistical Refutations from Greek to Syriac.

These Arabic translations of the Aristotelian corpus were continued by his students (especially Yahya ibn Adi) and were used by later Arabic philosophers such as Avicenna.

Abu Bishr wrote several commentaries of his own on Aristotle but they are all lost.

=== Translations ===
==== Aristotelian Corpus ====
- Posterior Analytics from Hunayn ibn Ishaq's Syriac version,
- Book Lambda of Aristotle's Metaphysics with commentary by Alexander of Aphrodisias and Themistius' epitome.
- On Generation and Corruption with commentaries by Alexander of Aphrodisias and by Olympiodorus the Younger.
- Sense and Sensibilia
- Poetics
- Part of De Caelo with commentary by Alexander of Aphrodisias
- Commentaries by Alexander of Aphrodisias and Olympiodorus the Younger on the Meteorology

==== Other Translations ====
- The Lesser Compendium of Johannes Serapion the Elder
- On Providence by Alexander of Aphrodisias

=== Debate on the merits of logic and grammar ===
Abu Bishr was reported to have had a debate with the Muslim theologian and grammarian, Abu Sa'id al-Sirafi, on the merits of logic and grammar, during an audience with the vizier in Baghdad in 932. Accounts of the debate are considered to be biased towards al-Sirafi, but the debate appeared to have gone in al-Sirafi's favour, who attacked the concept of logic as only applicable to the Greeks and not useful for Arabic speakers. Al-Sirafi also managed to confound Abu Bishr with a series of Arabic grammatical riddles. Abu Bishr's younger colleagues, Al-Farabi and Yahya ibn Adi would later offer additional arguments to support his case.
