= Ramean tree =

Ramean tree may refer to:

- Arbor porphyriana
- Any binary tree
