= Pedro Gallego =

Spanish scholar and bishop

Page from a copy of Pedro Gallego's Summa de astronomia. The drawing depicts the relative positions of the planets on 1 May 1273.

Pedro González Pérez (c. 1197 – 19 November 1267), known as Pedro Gallego (Latin: Petrus Gallecus or Gallegus), was a Franciscan scholar and prelate. He was the first bishop of Cartagena from the diocese's restoration in 1248 until his death, and played a prominent role in organizing the church in the region of Murcia after 1243. He also compiled, abridged and adapted previous translations from Arabic into Latin, producing books on zoology, astronomy and economics.

== Life ==
Pedro was born about 1197 in Galicia, whence his nickname Gallego. According to the 18th-century historian Pablo Manuel Ortega, his birthplace was Santa Marta de Ortigueira and his father was Gonzalo Pérez Gallego. He was probably of noble birth, and may have been educated at the Franciscan convent of Val de Dios (Vallis Dei) near Santiago de Compostela, where he may have learned Arabic. He entered the Franciscan order before the Spanish peninsula was divided into separate provinces. According to Juan Gil de Zamora, he joined the convent of La Bastida in Toledo under the superior Alfonso Martínez shortly after its founding in 1219. He succeeded Alfonso as superior and in 1236 became the first minister provincial of Castile after a chapter-general held at Soria in 1233 divided Spain into three provinces. This brought him into contact with King Ferdinand III.

In the 1240s, Pedro served as confessor to the future Alfonso X. He accompanied Alfonso when the latter established a Castilian protectorate over the Muslim Kingdom of Murcia in 1243. The city of Cartagena submitted to Castilian rule in 1244 and Pope Innocent IV restored its bishopric, which had been vacant for over two hundred years, the last reference to a bishop being from 988. Pedro was made bishop of Cartagena probably by 1248, certainly by 1250, when he travelled to Lyon to be consecrated by Innocent IV on 31 July. On the same day, Innocent issued a bull to Alfonso, In plenam volentes, asking him to endow the new diocese. In Lyon, Pedro also obtained independence for his church from the metropolitanates of Toledo and Tarragona through the bull Novella plantatio Carthaginensis, making Cartagena subject directly to the Holy See. The old see of Cartagena that had disappeared after the 10th century had been a metropolitanate itself.

Up to this point, Pedro's career must be reconstructed from the chronicles of the contemporary Gil de Zamora and the much less reliable Manuel Ortega, but after his appointment as bishop his career can be traced in numerous documents, such as royal privileges and papal bulls. In the 1250s, he frequently served on commissions for the organization of conquered territory. On 23 December 1252, he was authorized to select candidates for the new bishopric being set up in conquered territory. He also obtained buildings for the church in Murcia and property in Seville from the king. He took an interest in the Christian communities of North Africa. His knowledge of Arabic, certainly acquired before he became bishop, was probably key to his successes on the frontier. He collaborated with the Dominicans in setting up a language school, the Studium arabicum et latinum, in Murcia.

In 1265, on account of the revolt of the Mudéjares, Pedro had to abandon the city of Cartagena and take refuge in the countryside, only returning after James I of Aragon had crushed the rebels and conquered Murcia. Pedro died in Cartagena during an epidemic of fevers on 19 November 1267 at seventy years of age. His body was transferred to the cathedral of Murcia in 1291.

== Works ==
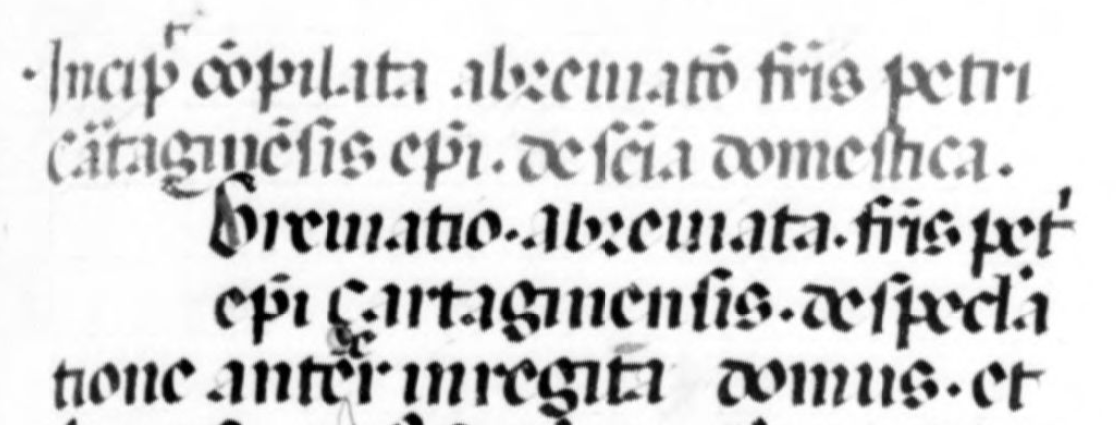
The incipit at the start of De regitiva domus in the Paris manuscript (Bibliothèque Nationale de France, MS lat. 6818) reads: "[Here] begins the epitome compiled by brother Peter, bishop of Cartagena, on the domestic science."

Three works by Pedro Gallego are known. None were known before 1924, when Auguste Pelzer published editions of two from manuscripts he found in Rome and Paris. In 1943, Gaudenzio Melani discovered two chapters of a third work in the municipal library of Sarnano. Since then José Martínez Gázquez has discovered the rest of this work in a Spanish manuscript, now Biblioteca Nacional de España, MS 8918. All three works have been edited and published by Martínez Gázquez.

Although often labelled translations, Pedro's works are now seen as compilations and adaptations of existing translations. Pedro affirms in a prologue that he could read Arabic, but the incipits of his works describe him variously not as translating but as reading, compiling, selecting, abridging, shortening, subtracting, adding, copying, transferring and transforming. Nonetheless, some of his citations may be to Arabic originals and some of his words even true translations from the Arabic. His works are not wholly unoriginal. Hugo Marquant compares him to a modern translator creating a new translation of an already translated work and constantly looking back at his predecessor's work.

- Liber de animalibus is a partial adaptation of Averroes' Arabic epitome of Aristotle's originally Greek Parts of Animals. This survives incomplete in a single manuscript. In the prologue to this work, Pedro says that he read Aristotle's Part of Animals in both Arabic and Latin, that is, the earlier translation of Michael Scot. For the first ten chapters, Pedro cites the work of Antecer and Abenfarag, probably the 11th-century Christian Arabic writers Ibn Zurʿa and Ibn al-Ṭayyib. It is for the eleventh and twelfth chapters that he cites Averroes (whom he calls Abuluatit Auenroyz). He also cites al-Fārābī (Abonacer).
- De regitiva domus (or De scientia domestica) is a work on household management. It is also most likely adaptation of an existing Latin work, possibly a translation of Aristotle's Economics from the Greek, but more probably a translation of Galen's Yconomica from Arabic or a translation of an epitome by Averroes on the same. Pelzer thought it had peculiarities that indicated translation from an Arabic original. It is preserved in two manuscripts (one in Paris, one in Rome). Certain similarities between this work and Alfonso X's Siete Partidas led the Franciscan scholar Atanasio López Fernández to conclude that Pedro was one of Alfonso's collaborators in this work. Juan Torres Fontes detected in De regitiva domus original ideas probably not found in his sources.
- Summa de astronomia (or Summa astronomica) is described in one incipit as "composed by friar Pedro Gallego ... all taken from al-Farghānī". According Marquant, the underlying work is the Liber de aggregationibus scientie stellarum, the work of al-Farghānī that existed in two Latin translations by Pedro's time, that of John of Seville and another by Gerard of Cremona. Pedro appears to have used the latter as his base text. According to Julio Samsó, the Summa is designed to demonstrate the sizes of and distances between various celestial bodies. It relies entirely on Latin sources, such as Martianus Capella and Macrobius, and Arabic sources translated into Latin by the school of Toledo, such as Averroes, al-Biṭrūjī and Ptolemy's originally Greek Almagest. These works were available in both Toledo and Galicia. Pedro's Summa exhibits a tendency to enlarge the universe, a tendency also found in other late medieval astronomers, such as Levi ben Gerson. For this reason, he relies more on Martianus and Macrobius, whose universe is larger, than on al-Farghānī and the Arabic tradition derived from Ptolemy.
