= On the Cave of the Nymphs in the Odyssey =

Treatise by Porphyry

On the Cave of the Nymphs in the Odyssey (Ancient Greek: Περὶ τοῦ ἐν Ὀδυσσείᾳ τῶν νυμφῶν ἄντρου; Latin: De Antro Nympharum) is a treatise by the Neoplatonist philosopher Porphyry. It is an exegesis of a passage from Homer's Odyssey, which Porphyry interprets as an allegory about the cosmos and the soul.

== Summary ==
On the Cave of the Nymphs in the Odyssey is an exegesis of lines 102 to 112 in book 13 of the Odyssey, which describe a cave on Odysseus' home island of Ithaca. The passage follows here in original Greek and in Robert D. Lamberton's English translation:

αὐτὰρ ἐπὶ κρατὸς λιμένος τανύφυλλος ἐλαίη,
ἀγχόθι δ ̓ αὐτῆς ἄντρον ἐπήρατον ἠεροειδές,
ἱρὸν νυμφάων αἱ νηϊάδες καλέονται.
ἐν δὲ κρητῆρές τε καὶ ἀμφιφορῆες ἔασιν
λάϊνοι· ἔνθα δ ̓ ἔπειτα τιθαιβώσσουσι μέλισσαι.
ἐν δ ̓ ἱστοὶ λίθεοι περιμήκεες, ἔνθα τε νύμφαι
φάρε ̓ ὑφαίνουσιν ἁλιπόρφυρα, θαῦμα ἰδέσθαι·
ἐν δ ̓ ὕδατ ̓ ἀενάοντα. δύω δέ τέ οἱ θύραι εἰσίν,
αἱ μὲν πρὸς Βορέαο καταιβαταὶ ἀνθρώποισιν,
αἱ δ ̓ αὖ πρὸς Νότου εἰσὶ θεώτεραι· οὐδέ τι κείνῃ
ἄνδρες ἐσέρχονται, ἀλλ ̓ ἀθανάτων ὁδός ἐστιν.

and at the head of the harbor is a slender-leaved olive
and near by it a lovely and murky cave
sacred to the nymphs called Naiads.
Within are kraters and amphoras
of stone, where bees lay up stores of honey.
Inside, too, are massive stone looms and there the nymphs
weave sea-purple cloth, a wonder to see.
The water flows unceasingly. The cave has two gates,
the one from the north, a path for men to descend,
while the other, toward the south, is divine. Men do not
enter by this one, but it is rather a path for immortals.

Porphyry leaves open whether the cave actually existed or was an invention by Homer, but in either case stresses its significance as an allegory. He associates the cave motif with Plato's allegory of the cave and the Mithraeum (the cave sacred to adherents of the Roman mystery religion centered on the god Mithras) and regards it as a symbol for the world. The Naiads and their association with flowing water are described as vital to the cosmology of Greek mythology. Various connections are presented between bees and honey and Greek and Mithraic concepts, including associations between honey and nectar—the food of the gods—and libations of honey. The positions of the two gates are connected to the zodiac, ancient Greek astronomy and the north and south winds. The olive tree outside the cave is associated with Athena and thoughtfulness, and Porphyry says it is significant that the tree is located outside of the cave—the world—but close to it. Porphyry agrees with Numenius of Apamea that the Odyssey is a symbolic description of man's successive passing through genesis (Greek: γένεσις, 'origin'). He interprets the cave of the nymphs as an allegorical image of the relationship between the soul and genesis at the end of Odysseus' journey.

== Publication ==
The Greek text was first published in print by Janus Lascaris in 1518. Thomas Taylor published an English translation in 1823. The most recent English versions are one produced in 1969 by a postgraduate seminar class led by Leendert Gerrit Westerink and Lamberton's translation from 1983.

== Reception ==
The Cave of the Nymphs in the Odyssey is frequently discussed by scholars interested in ancient allegorical interpretation and the readings of Homer by the Neoplatonists. Modern scholars disagree whether the treatise presents a coherent and consistent literary interpretation. It has drawn interest from scholars of Mithraism for its cosmological discussion of the Mithraeum and because it invites comparisons between Mithraism and Neoplatonism. Its references to Mithra and Zoroaster have in turn been read through the opposition to Gnosticism in the Enneads by Porphyry's teacher Plotinus; the theologian Mark J. Edwards argues that Porphyry directed his treatise against the Gnostics and wanted to promote the view that truth is reached gradually, not immediately.

== See also ==
- Neoplatonism and Gnosticism
- Nymphaeum
