= Against the Christians =

Late 3rd-century book written by Porphyry of Tyre

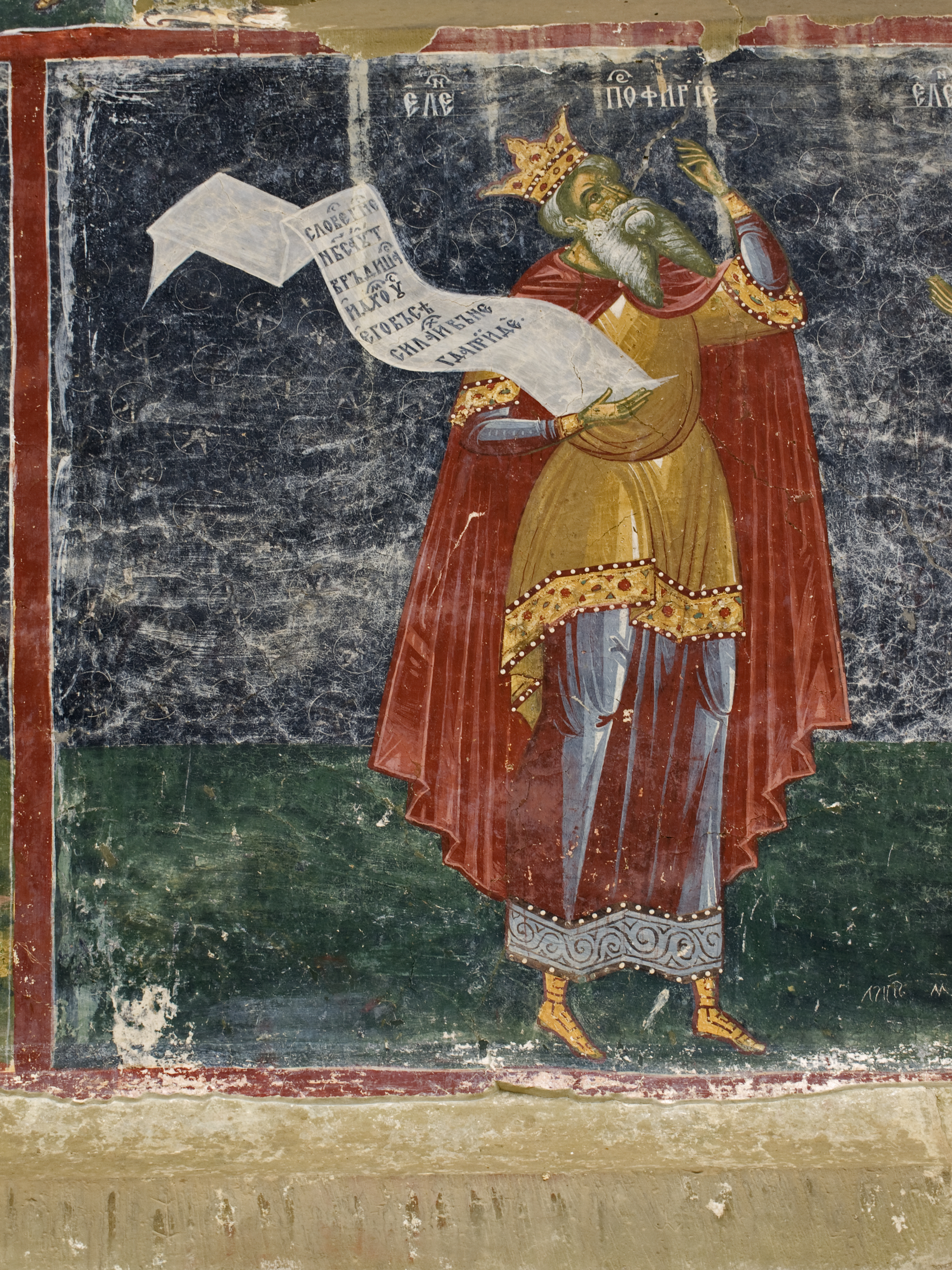
- Porphyry, c. 1535, Sucevița Monastery.
- Author: Porphyry of Tyre
- Language: Greek
- Published: c. 275–300 AD

Against the Christians (Ancient Greek: Κατὰ Χριστιανῶν; Latin: Adversus Christianos) is a late 3rd-century book written by Roman-Phoenician Neoplatonic philosopher Porphyry of Tyre, challenging the writings of Christian philosophers and theologians. Due to widespread censorship by Roman imperial authorities, no known copies of this book exist. Only through references to it in Christian writings criticizing it can its contents be reconstructed.

== Background ==
During his retirement in Sicily, Porphyry wrote Against the Christians (Κατὰ Χριστιανῶν; Adversus Christianos) which consisted of fifteen books. Some thirty Christian apologists, such as Methodius, Eusebius, Apollinaris, Augustine, Jerome, etc., responded to his challenge. In fact, everything known about Porphyry's arguments is found in these refutations, largely because Theodosius II ordered every copy burned in AD 435 and again in 448.

Augustine and the 5th-century ecclesiastical historian Socrates of Constantinople assert that Porphyry was once a Christian.

== Contents ==
Porphyry saw Christians as treasonous and immoral, and believed that those who would not convert away from the religion should be executed. He saw it as a religion of women and the lower class which was superstitious and not respectable: by drawing people away from the worship of the traditional gods, it was endangering the safety of the Empire. As quoted by Jerome, Porphyry mocked Paul and the early Christians while suggesting that the "magical arts" performed by Jesus of Nazareth and his followers were nothing special, done similarly by other figures of Greco-Roman history:

He did it all for money; [...] (They were) poor and country-dwelling men, seeing that they used to have nothing; certain wonders were worked with magical arts. Not that it is unusual however to do wonders; for the magicians in Egypt also did wonders against Moses, Apollonius also did them, Apuleius also did them, and any number have done wonders. [They did wonders by magical arts] so that they might receive riches from rich and impressionable women, whom they had led astray.

=== Criticism of Christian scripture ===
Porphyry claimed the Gospel authors were not eyewitnesses but "fiction writers" who based their accounts on "hearsay" and likewise denied Moses' authorship of the Pentateuch, stating that "all the things attributed to Moses were really written eleven hundred years later by Ezra and his contemporaries" after the end of the Babylonian captivity. He also challenged the prophecy of Daniel, because Jews and Christians pointed to the historical fulfillment of its prophecies as a decisive argument: but these prophecies, he maintained, were written not by Daniel but by some Jew who in the time of Antiochus Epiphanes (d. 164 BC) gathered up the traditions of Daniel's life and wrote a history of recent past events but in the future tense, falsely dating them back to Daniel's time. He based this on the fact the book accurately describes all the events which happen up to the 160s BC, while all its predictions for after that time failed to materialize. According to Jerome:

Porphyry ... alleged that "Daniel" did not foretell the future so much as he related the past, and lastly that whatever he spoke of up till the time of Antiochus contained authentic history, whereas anything he may have conjectured beyond that point was false, inasmuch as he would not have foreknown the future.

== Translations and commentaries ==
- Wilken, Robert Louis (1984). "Porphyry: The Most Learned Critic of All". The Christians as the Romans Saw Them (Second, reprinted ed.). New Haven: Yale University Press. pp. 126–160. ISBN 978-0-300-03066-2. JSTOR j.ctt32bdb2 – via the Internet Archive.
- Hoffmann, R. Joseph (1994). Porphyry's Against the Christians: The Literary Remains. Prometheus Books. ISBN 9780879758899 – via Google Books.
- Berchman, Robert (2005). Porphyry Against the Christians. Studies in Platonism, Neoplatonism, and the Platonic Tradition. Vol. 1. Leiden: BRILL. ISBN 978-90-04-14811-6. ISSN 1871-188X – via Google Books.

== See also ==
- Anti-Christian sentiment
- Against the Galileans
- Celsus
- Pliny the Younger on Christians
- The True Word
- Digeser, Elizabeth DePalma (1998). "Lactantius, Porphyry, and the Debate over Religious Toleration". Journal of Roman Studies. 88: 129–146. doi:10.2307/300808. ISSN 0075-4358. JSTOR 300808. S2CID 161341468.
- Edwards, Mark (2007). "Porphyry and the Christians". Bulletin of the Institute of Classical Studies. Supplement. 50 (98, Studies on Porphyry): 111–126. doi:10.1111/j.2041-5370.2007.tb02508.x. JSTOR 43767975.
- Socrates Scholasticus (1885). Historia Ecclesiastica . Vol. Book I, Ch 9, pp. 30-31 – via Wikisource.
- Socrates Scholasticus (1885b). Historia Ecclesiastica . Vol. Book III, Ch 23 – via Wikisource.
- Stevenson, James (1987). A New Eusebius: Documents Illustrating the History of the Church to AD 337. SPCK. ISBN 978-0-281-04268-5.
