= Book of the Ten Treatises of the Eye =

Ninth-century dissertation

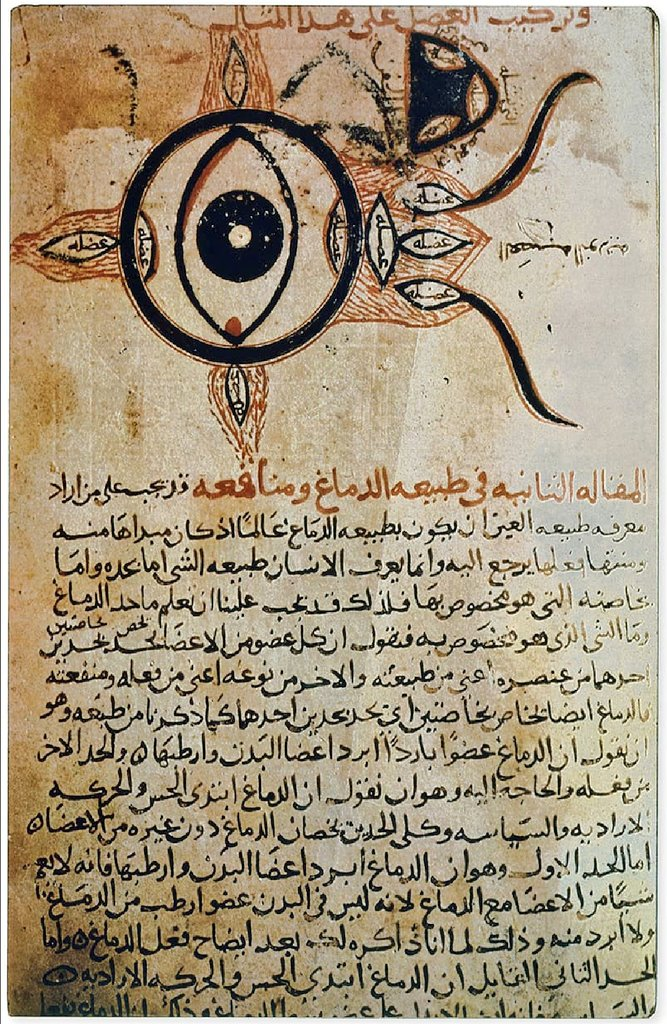
- Hunayn ibn Ishaq 9th century CE description of the eye diagram in a copy of his book, Kitab al-Ashr Maqalat fil-Ayn ("Ten Treatises on the Eye"), in a 12th century CE edition
- Author: Hunayn ibn Ishaq
- Original title: كتاب العشر مقالات في للعين
- Language: Arabic
- Subject: Ophthalmology
- Genre: Medical literature
- Published: 9th century
- Publication place: Abbasid Caliphate
- Media type: Manuscript

Book of the Ten Treatises of the Eye (Arabic: كتاب العشر مقالات في للعين, Kitab al-Ashr Maqalat fil-Ayn) is a 9th-century theory of vision written by Hunayn ibn Ishaq, based upon the cosmological natures of pathways from the brain to the object being perceived. This ophthalmic composition is heavily derived from Galen's De placitis Hippocratis at Platonis and De usu partium, both in terms of the anatomy and physiology being described. Hunayn's triumph comes from the systematic presentation of the parts of eye and the subsequent additions he made to the cosmological aspects of the work. Its early translation to Latin also provided a means for medieval ophthalmologists in the West to come into contact with the work of Galen.

== Overview ==
There are four essential doctrines that shape Hunayn's dissertation on vision and the anatomy of the eye:

- Structural order – the individual components of the eye each have their own nature, and are arranged so that they are in cosmological harmony.
- Medical teleology – the existence of each of these individual components is dictated by their ultimate purpose, vision. Their secondary purpose, guided by their immediate nature, dictates how vision will be achieved.
- The elements – each of the four elements of earth, fire, air and water corresponds to a single sense. The fifth sense is a combination of two of the four elements described.
- Applicability of components – the effectiveness of each of the five senses depends largely on a component which is like the object of its sensation.

Hunayn relies on these principles to build up his conception of vision, which incorporates the anatomy of the eye in a way that makes discussion of one without the other unproductive.

== Anatomy of the eye ==
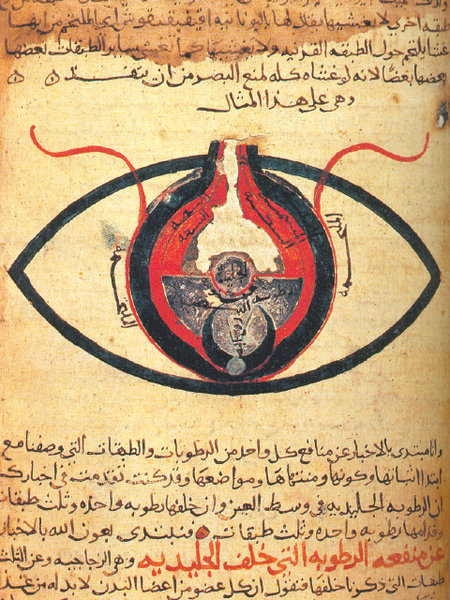
Manuscript, dated circa 1200 CE. Cairo National Library.

The structure of the eye is presented as a hierarchy, starting first with the part that is most directly responsible for sight, and working down towards the parts which exists only to facilitate this function. The lens, described as white, transparent, and luminous have a composition which lends itself to quickly receive colors. As opposed to Galen's more mathematical conception of flat-like lens, Hunayn opts for a more spherical shape which allows for a larger field of vision. Hunayn repeatedly emphasized that he believed the crystalline lens to be in the exact center of the eye. Hunayn may have been the originator of this idea. The idea of the central crystalline lens was widely believed from Hunayn's period through the late 1500s. He describes the system behind the eyes that connects it to the brain, starting with the sclera, a thick, hard membrane which protects the inner parts of the nerves from injury. The chorioid, a thin and soft structure filled with veins and arteries, follows next and provides nourishment to the overall structure. Finally, the retina transmits nutrients to the lenses themselves. Hunayn then presents the system responsible for protecting the eye. From the outermost level, these are the conjunctiva, cornea, and uvea. While both the conjunctiva and cornea provide protection with minimizing hindrance to the lenses, the uvea has an extra function of concentrating the pneuma exiting out of the eye to prevent it from being dissipated by light.

== Uses of the brain ==
The brain, being the source of perception, voluntary movement, and free will, is also described as the source of psychic pneuma. Starting out from the heart as vital pneuma, it moves towards the brain where it is further refined into the specialized pneuma to be employed for vision. Hunayn also introduces the concept of a sense hierarchy, placing sight at the top of the list with the corresponding element of fire. He also describes three levels of this element: flame, red heat, and light, rationalizing the inclusion of light by describing the creation of flames after concentrating it via a magnetic glass. Hunayn connects all of these ideas by referencing the fact that the brain works directly to provide the eyes with the pneuma necessary to carry out its function, with light providing the illumination needed to discern the object being viewed.

== Function of pneuma and sight ==
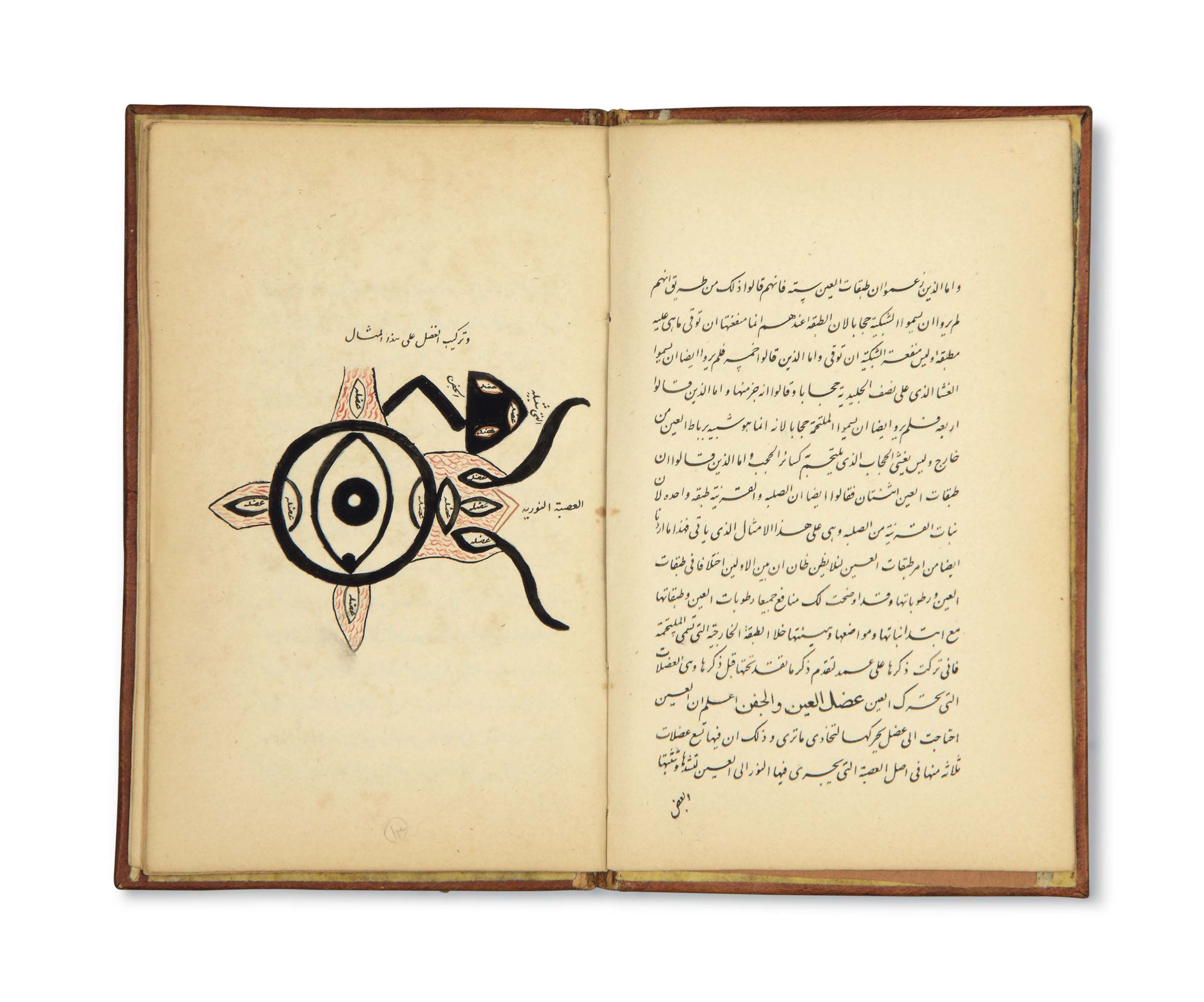
Three treatises (maqalat) on ophtalmology, Qajar Iran, first half of the 19th century.

Once concentrated in the brain, the highly fluid psychic pneuma travels along the network of the eye until it penetrates the forward region. The pneuma mixes with a preexisting aqueous humor, filling up the uvea and causing the stretches observed within the pupil. If one eye is closed and another is left open, the pneuma designated to the closed eye is instead redirected to the open one, causing the expansion of the pupil observed afterward. After collecting in the uvea, this pneuma then travels along the medium of air, causing a transformation that conforms to the shape around it, sending this signal back to the eye. An analogy to describe this phenomenon is offered by Hunayn:

If a person is walking in the dark and holds a stick in his hand and stretches it out full length before him, and the stick encounters an object which prevents it from advancing further, he knows immediately by analogy that the object preventing the stick from advancing is a solid body which resists anything that comes up against it...it is the same with vision.

In other words, the air acts as the stick that allows the pneuma to identify the object, and transmit that back to the eye to produce sight as long as there is light. Both light and pneuma act together to eradicate barriers and direct the immediate transition of sensation to the eye, thus attaining vision.
