= Ibn Zur'a =

Syriac philosopher and physician (943–1008)

Abū ʿAlī ʿĪsā ibn Isḥāq ibn Zurʿa (Arabic: ابن زرعة; 943–1008) was a medieval Syriac Orthodox physician and philosopher.

Ibn Zurʿa was born in 943 in Baghdad, then the capital of the Abbasid Caliphate. In theology and philosophy, he was a student of Yahya ibn Adi. He also studied medicine and was renowned as a physician, according to Ibn Abi Usaybi'a. According to Abu Hayyan al-Tawhidi, he was accused of treason for engaging in trade with the Byzantines. Convicted, his possessions were confiscated and he died in Baghdad in 1008.

Ibn Zurʿa's works are listed in the Fihrist. He translated several works from Syriac into Arabic. His translations include Aristotle's History of Animals and Sophistici elenchi and Proclus' commentary on Plato's Phaedo. He also translated a commentary by Nicolaus of Damascus on Aristotle. He wrote original works on logic and intellection. He may be the philosopher "Antecer" cited by Pedro Gallego in his Latin works of the 13th century, if the latter is a garbled version of Avençer.
