= Yahya ibn Adi =

Arab Christian philosopher (893–974)

Abū Zakarīyā’ Yaḥyá ibn ʿAdī (John, father of Zachary, son of Adi) known as Yahya ibn Adi (893–974) was an Arab Christian philosopher, theologian and translator working in Arabic.

== Biography ==
Yahya ibn Adi was born in Tikrit (modern-day Iraq) in 893.

In Baghdad he studied philosophy and medicine under Abu Bishr Matta ibn Yunus, who had also taught Al-Farabi.

He translated numerous works of Greek philosophy into Arabic, mostly from existing versions in Syriac. These include: Plato's Laws; Aristotle's Sophistical Refutations (from a Syriac translation by Theophilus of Edessa) and Topics (from a translation by Hunayn ibn Ishaq); and Theophrastus' Metaphysics.

He also composed a number of philosophical and theological treatises, the most significant being Tahdhib al-akhlaq and Maqala fi at-tawhid. He taught a number of Christian and Muslim students, including Ibn Miskawayh, Ibn al-Khammar and Ibn Zura. Ibn Zura made Arabic translations of Aristotle and other Greek writers from Syriac.

He died in 974 and is buried in the Syriac church of St Thomas in Baghdad.
