= David (commentator) =

Greek scholar and commentator

David (Greek: Δαυΐδ; fl. 6th century) was a Greek scholar and a commentator on Aristotle and Porphyry.

He may have come from Thessaly, but in later times he was confused with an Armenian of the same name (David Anhaght). He was a pupil of Olympiodorus in Alexandria in the late 6th century. His name suggests that he was a Jew or a Christian.

Three commentaries to Aristotle's works attributed to him have survived: as well as an introduction (prolegomena) to philosophy:

- Definitions and Divisions of Philosophy
- Commentary on Porphyry's Isagoge
- Commentary on Aristotle's Categories
- Commentary on Aristotle's Prior Analytics (in Armenian)

All these works will be published, with an English translation, in the series Commentaria in Aristotelem Armeniaca - Davidis Opera (five volumes), edited by Jonathan Barnes and Valentina Calzolari.

Another anonymous commentary on Porphyry's Isagoge which was falsely ascribed to Elias, was also falsely ascribed to David. Its author is known today as Pseudo-Elias.

== Bibliography ==
- A. Busse (ed.), Eliae in Porphyrii Isagogen et Aristotelis Categorias commentaria, Berlin, 1900 (Commentaria in Aristotelem Graeca, XVIII-1).
- A. Busse (ed.), Davidis Prolegomena et in Porphyrii Isagogen commentarium, Berlin, 1904 (Commentaria in Aristotelem Graeca, XVIII-2).
- B. Kendall, R. W. Thomson (eds.), Definitions and Divisions of Philosophy by David the Invincible Philosopher, English Translation of the Old Armenian Version with Introduction and Notes, Chico, CA, 1983.
- V. Calzolari, J. Barnes (eds.), L'œuvre de David l'Invincible et la transmission de la pensée grecque dans la tradition arménienne et syriaque (CAA. Davidis Opera 1), Leiden - Boston: Brill, 2009 (Philosophia Antiqua 116).
- A. Topchyan (ed.), David the Invincible, Commentary on Aristotle's Prior Analytics. Old Armenian Text with an English Translation, Introduction and Notes (CAA. Davidis Opera 2), Leiden - Boston: Brill, 2010 (Philosophia Antiqua 122).
- G. Muradyan (ed.), David the Invincible Commentary on Porphyry’s Isagoge. Old Armenian Text with an English Translation, Introduction and Notes (CAA. Davidis Opera 3), Leiden - Boston: Brill, 2014 (Philosophia Antiqua 137).
