= On the Sects for Beginners =

On the Sects for Beginners (Latin: De sectis) is a Greek book by Galen. He himself recommended it as the first of his books a student of medicine should read. It describes the major sects in ancient Greek medicine, the Rationalists (or Dogmatists), Empiricists and Methodists. Galen is sympathetic to the Rationalists against the Empiricists, but argues for an alliance between the sects against the Methodists.

The book is organized into nine chapters as follows:

1. Definitions
2. Empiricism
3. Rationalism
4. Empiricism and Rationalism compared
5. Mutual criticisms
6. Methodism
7. The case for Methodism
8. The Empiricist answer
9. The Rationalist answer

There are several commentaries on On Sects. There is a complete commentary in Latin by Agnellus of Ravenna. There is another Latin commentary by Pseudo-John of Alexandria. A commentary by John Philoponus was translated into Arabic and there is an original Arabic commentary by Ibn al-Ṭayyib.

== Sources ==
- Bouras-Vallianatos, Petros; Zipser, Barbara, eds. (2019). Brill's Companion to the Reception of Galen. Brill.
  - Garofalo, Ivan. "Galen's Legacy in Alexandrian Texts Written in Greek, Latin, and Arabic". In Bouras-Vallianatos & Zipser (2019), pp. 62–85.
- Brock, A. J., ed. (1929). Greek Medicine. J. M. Dent.
- Walzer, Richard; Frede, Michael, eds. (1985). Galen: Three Treatises on the Nature of Science. Hackett Publishing Company.
  - Frede, Michael. Introduction. In Walzer & Frede (1985), pp. ix–xxxiv.
  - Galen; Michael Frede (trans.). "On the Sects for Beginners". In Walzer & Frede (1985), pp. 1–20.
