= Christian Wildberg =

German philosopher

- Born: 1957 (age 68–69)

Education
- Education: University of Marburg, Cambridge University (PhD)

Philosophical work
- Era: 21st-century philosophy
- Region: Western philosophy
- Institutions: University of Pittsburgh, Princeton University
- Main interests: Greek philosophy

Christian Wildberg (born 1957) is a German classical scholar and Andrew W. Mellon Professor at the University of Pittsburgh. He is emeritus professor of classics at Princeton University. He is known for his works on Greek philosophy.

== Books ==
- Philoponus: Against Aristotle on the Eternity of the World. London: Duckworth 1987, 188pp.
- John Philoponus’ Criticism of Aristotle's Theory of Aether. Peripatoi 16, Berlin, New York: De Gruyter 1988, 274pp.
- Simplicius against Philoponus on the Eternity of the World. London: Duckworth 1991, pp. 95–135. (Co-authored with David Furley).
- Hyperesie und Epiphanie. Ein Versuch über die Bedeutung der Götter in den Dramen des Euripides. Zetemata 109, Beck Verlag, München 2002, 231pp.

=== Edited ===
- Euripides and Tragic Theatre in the Late Fifth Century. Co-edited with Martin Cropp, Kevin Lee, David Sansone, Eric Csapo and Donald Mastronarde. Illinois Classical Studies 24/25, Champaign, Il., 2000.
- Religion, Mysticism, and Ethics: A Cross-traditional Anthology. Co-edited with Daniel Zelinski. Archiv für Religionsgeschichte 9. Saur Verlag Munich, 2007.
- New Perspectives on Aristotle's De caelo. A collection of interpretative articles on Aristotle's cosmological treatise. Co-edited with Alan Bowen. Philosophia Antiqua 117, Brill, Leiden 2009, 321pp.
- Dionysos und die vordionysischen Kulte. A posthumous edition of Vyacheslav Ivanov's manuscript on Dionysiac Religion. Co-editor with Michael Wachtel. Mohr Siebeck 2012, 416pp.
- A Handbook of Neoplatonism. Oxford University Press (in preparation).
