= Hunayn ibn Ishaq =

Arab Christian scholar, physician and scientist (809–873)

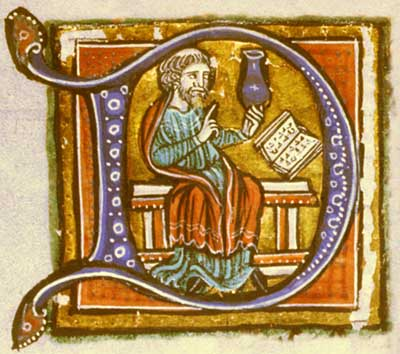
- Iluminure from the Hunayn ibn-Ishaq al-'Ibadi manuscript of the Isagoge
- Born: 808 AD; Al-Hirah, Iraq
- Died: 873 AD; Baghdad, Abbasid Caliphate

Academic work
- Era: Islamic Golden Age
- Main interests: Translation, ophthalmology, philosophy, religion, Arabic grammar
- Notable works: Book of the Ten Treatises of the Eye
- Influenced: Ishaq ibn Hunayn

Hunayn ibn Ishaq al-Ibadi (808–873; also Hunain or Hunein; Arabic: أبو زيد حنين بن إسحاق العبادي; ʾAbū Zayd Ḥunayn ibn ʾIsḥāq al-ʿIbādī; known in Latin as Johannitius) was an influential Iraqi Assyrian Nestorian Christian translator, scholar, physician, and scientist. During the apex of the Islamic Abbasid era, he worked with a group of translators, among whom were Abū 'Uthmān al-Dimashqi, Ibn Mūsā al-Nawbakhti, and Thābit ibn Qurra, to translate books of philosophy and classical Greek and Persian texts into Arabic and Syriac.

Ḥunayn ibn Isḥaq was his era's most productive translator of Greek medical and scientific treatises. He studied Greek and became known as the "Sheikh of the Translators". Along with his mother language Syriac, he mastered three other languages: Arabic, Greek, and Persian. Later translators widely followed Hunayn's method. He was originally from al-Hirah, previously the capital of the Lakhmid kingdom, but worked in Baghdad, the center of the Translation movement. His fame went far beyond the local community.

== Overview ==
In the Abbasid era, a new interest in extending the study of Greek science had arisen. At that time, there was a vast amount of untranslated ancient Greek literature pertaining to philosophy, mathematics, natural science, and medicine. This valuable information was only accessible to a very small minority of Middle Eastern scholars who knew the Greek language; the need for an organized translation movement was urgent.

In time, Hunayn ibn Ishaq became arguably the chief translator of the era, and laid the foundations of Islamic medicine. In his lifetime,Hunayn Ibn Ishaq translated countless works, including Plato's Timaeus, Aristotle's Metaphysics, and the Old Testament, into Syriac and Arabic. He personally translated 129 works of Galen himself, even travelling to find one, De demonstratione which he found half of in Damascus. Ibn Ishaq also produced 36 of his own books, 21 of which covered the field of medicine. His son Ishaq, and his nephew Hubaysh, worked together with him at times to help translate. Hunayn ibn Ishaq is known for his translations, his method of translation, and his contributions to medicine. He has also been suggested by François Viré to be the true identity of the Arabic falconer Moamyn, author of De Scientia Venandi per Aves. Hunayn Ibn Ishaq was a translator at the House of Wisdom, Bayt al-Hikma, where he received his education. In the West, another name he is known by his Latin name, Joannitius. It was the translations that came from administrative and legal materials gathered that lead to understanding of how to build up Arabic as the new official language.

== Early life ==
Hunayn ibn Ishaq was an Arab Nestorian, born in 808, during the Abbasid period, in al-Hirah, to an ethnic Arab family and Arab tribe of Ibad. Hunayn in classical sources is said to have belonged to the ʿIbad, thus his nisba "al-Ibadi. The ʿIbad was an Arab community composed of different Arab tribes that had once converted to the Church of the East and lived in al-Hira. They were known for their literacy and multilingualism, being fluent in Syriac, their liturgical and cultural language, in addition to their native Arabic.

As a child, he learned the Syriac and Arabic languages. Although al-Hira was known for commerce and banking, and his father was a pharmacist, Hunayn went to Baghdad in order to study medicine. In Baghdad, Hunayn had the privilege to study under renowned physician Yuhanna ibn Masawayh; however, Hunayn's countless questions irritated Yuhanna, causing him to scold Hunayn and forcing him to leave. Hunayn promised himself to return to Baghdad when he became a physician. He went abroad to master the Greek language. On his return to Baghdad, Hunayn displayed his newly acquired skills by reciting the works of Homer and Galen. In awe, ibn Masawayh reconciled with Hunayn, and the two started to work cooperatively.

Hunayn was extremely motivated in his work to master Greek studies, which enabled him to translate Greek texts into Syriac and Arabic. The Abbasid Caliph al-Mamun noticed Hunayn's talents and placed him in charge of the House of Wisdom, the Bayt al Hikmah. The House of Wisdom was an institution where Greek works were translated and made available to scholars. (At least one scholar has argued that there is no evidence of Hunayn being placed in charge of the Bayt al Hikmah.) The caliph also gave Hunayn the opportunity to travel to Byzantium in search of additional manuscripts, such as those of Aristotle and other prominent authors.

== Accomplishments ==
In Hunayn ibn Ishaq's lifetime, he devoted himself to working on a multitude of writings; both translations and original works.

=== As a writer of original work ===
Hunayn wrote on a variety of subjects that included philosophy, religion and medicine. In "How to Grasp Religion", Hunayn explains the truths of religion that include miracles not possibly made by huhimans and humans' incapacity to explain facts about some phenomena, and false notions of religion that include depression and an inclination for glory. He also worked on Arabic grammar and lexicography, writing a unique grammar of the Arabic language titled "The Rules of Inflexion According to the System of the Greeks."

==== Ophthalmology ====
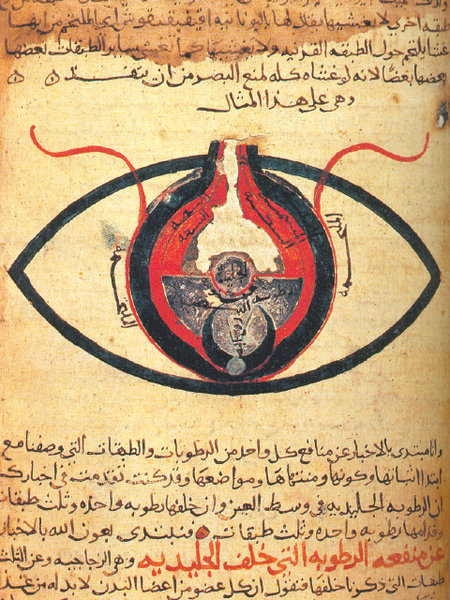
The eye according to Hunain ibn Ishaq. From a "Book of the Ten Treatises of the Eye" manuscript dated c. 1200.

Hunayn ibn Ishaq enriched the field of ophthalmology. His developments in the study of the human eye can be traced through his innovative book, "Book of the Ten Treatises of the Eye". This textbook is the first known systematic treatment of this field and was most likely used in medical schools at the time. Throughout the book, Hunayn explains the eye and its anatomy in minute detail; its diseases, their symptoms, and their treatments. Hunayn repeatedly emphasizes that he believes the crystalline lens to be in the center of the eye, and may have been the originator of this idea, which was widely believed from his lifetime through the late 1500s. He discusses the nature of cysts and tumors, and the swelling they cause. He discusses how to treat various corneal ulcers through surgery, and the therapy involved in repairing cataracts. The book is evidence of the skills Hunayn ibn Ishaq had not just as a translator and a physician, but also as a surgeon.

=== As a physician ===
Hunayn ibn Ishaq's reputation as a scholar and translator, and his close relationship with Caliph al-Mutawakkil, led the caliph to name Hunayn as his personal physician, ending the exclusive use of physicians from the Bukhtishu family. Despite their relationship, the caliph became distrustful; at the time, there were fears of death from poisoning, and physicians were well aware of its synthesis procedure. The caliph tested Hunayn's ethics as a physician by asking him to formulate a poison, to be used against a foe, in exchange for a large sum. Hunayn ibn Ishaq repeatedly rejected the Caliph's generous offers, saying he would need time to develop a poison. Disappointed, the caliph imprisoned his physician for a year. When asked why he would rather be killed than make the drug, Hunayn explained the physician's oath required him to help, and not harm, his patients. He completed many different medical works that pushed the idea of treating medicine with the practice and art of physic treatments. Some of his medical works were pulled from Greek sources such as, Fi Awja al-Ma'idah (On Stomach Ailments) and al-Masail fi'l-Tibb li'l-Muta'allimin (Questions on Medicine for Students) and having these sources to drawn on keeps the original text clear.

=== As a translator ===
With the construction of the House of Wisdom, the Abbasid Caliph al-Ma'mun wanted to have a place to gather world knowledge from Muslim and non-Muslim educators. Hunayn ibn Ishaq was one of the most well-known translators at the institution and was called the sheikh of the translators, as he mastered the four principal languages of the time: Greek, Persian, Arabic, and Syriac. He was able to translate compositions on philosophy, astronomy, mathematics, medicine, and even in subjects such as magic and oneiromancy. Nonetheless, none of his extant translations credit the House of Wisdom, which questions the legitimacy of whether this place actually was the origin of the Translation Movement. He laid down the basis of accurate translating techniques, which was extremely important for the accurate transmission of knowledge.

Some of Hunayn's most notable translations were his rendering of "De Materia Medica", a pharmaceutical handbook, and his most popular selection, "Questions on Medicine", a guide for novice physicians. Information was presented in the form of questions taken from Galen's "Art of Physic" and answers, which are based on "Summaria Alexandrinorum". For instance, Hunayn explains what the four elements and the four humors are and that medicine divides into therapy and practice and also defines health, disease, neutrality, and as well as the natural and the contranatural, and the six necessary conditions of living healthily.

Hunayn translated writings on agriculture, stones, and religion and also some of Plato's and Aristotle's works, in addition to commentaries. He also translated many medicinal texts and summaries, mainly those of Galen, such as Galen's "On Sects" and "On the Anatomy of the Veins and Arteries". His translations are some of the only remaining documents of Greek manuscripts, and he helped influence the art of medicine, and through his book al-'Ashar Maqalat fi'l-Ayn (The Ten Treatises on the Eye) he helped to expand the science of ophthalmology through theory and practice.

Many R. Duval's published works on chemistry represent translations of Hunayn's work. Also in Chemistry a book titled ['An Al-Asma'] meaning "About the Names", did not reach researchers but was used in "Dictionary of Ibn Bahlool" of the 10th century.

==== Translation techniques ====
In his efforts to translate Greek material, Hunayn ibn Ishaq was accompanied by his son Ishaq ibn Hunayn and his nephew Hubaysh. Hunayn would translate Greek into Syriac, and then he would have his nephew finish by translating the text from Syriac to Arabic, after which he then would seek to correct any of his partners' mistakes or inaccuracies he might find.

Unlike many translators in the Abbasid period, he largely did not try to follow the text's exact lexicon. Instead, he would try to summarize the topics of the original texts and then in a new manuscript paraphrase it in Syriac or Arabic. He also edited and redacted the available texts of technical works by comparing the information included therein with other works on similar subjects. Thus, his renditions may be seen as interpretations of medical, astronomical, and philosophical texts after researching the topics over which they range. Some scholars argue Hunayn's approach differed from previous translators through his commentaries on the subject and was influenced by Galen's ideas along the way.

Hunayn says:

Galen's works were translated before me by a certain Bin Sahda ... When I was young I translated them from a faulty Greek manuscript. Later when I was forty, my pupil Hubaish asked me to correct the translation. Meanwhile a number of manuscripts had accumulated in my possession. I collated these manuscripts and produced a single correct copy. Next I collated the Syriac text with it and corrected it. I am in the habit of doing this with everything I translate.

==== Selected translations ====
- "Kitab ila Aglooqan fi Shifa al Amraz" – This Arabic translation, related to Galen's Commentary, by Hunayn ibn Ishaq, is extant in the Library of Ibn Sina Academy of Medieval Medicine and Sciences. It is a masterpiece of all the literary works of Galen. It is part of the Alexandrian compendium of Galen's work. This manuscript from the 10th century is in two volumes that include details regarding various types of fevers (Humyat) and different inflammatory conditions of the body. More importantly, it includes details of more than 150 single and compound formulations of both herbal and animal origin. The book also provides an insight into understanding the traditions and methods of treatment in the Greek (Unani) and Roman eras.
- De medica
- De sectis
- De ossibus ad tirones
- De musculorum dissectione
- De nervorum dissectione
- De venarum arteriumque dissectione
- De elementis secundum Hippocratem
- De temperamentis
- De facultibus naturalibus
- De causis et symptomatibus
- De locis affectis De pulsibus (four treatises)
- De typis (febrium)
- De crisibus
- De diebus decretoriis
- Methodus medendi
- Hippocrates and Dioscorides

== Works ==
- Kitab Adab al-Falasifa, original Arabic lost, known in medieval translation.
- Libro de Los Buenos Proverbios (Castilian Spanish).
- Sefer Musré ha-Filosofim (Book of the Morals of the Philosophers), Hebrew translation of the Judeo-Andalusian poet, Juda ben Shlomo Al-Jarisi (1170–1235).
- Kayfiyyat idrāk ḥaqīqat al-diyāna [On how to discern the truth of religion].

== Fragments from various books interpolated or adapted ==
- General History of Alfonso el Sabio (Castilian Spanish).
- Llibre de Saviesa of James of Aragon (Castilian Spanish).
- The Pseudo Seneca (Castilian Spanish).
- La Floresta de Philosophos (Castilian Spanish).
- El Victorial (Castilian Spanish).
- Bocados de Oro, taken directly from Adab al-Falasifa (Spanish).

=== Other translated works ===
- Plato's Republic (Siyasah).
- Aristotle's Categories (Maqulas), Physics (Tabi'iyat) and Magna Moralia (Khulqiyat).
- Seven books of Galen's anatomy, lost in the original Greek, preserved in Arabic.
- Arabic version of the Old Testament from the Greek Septuagint did not survive.
- "Kitab al-Ahjar" or the "Book of Stones".

== See also ==
- Book of the Ten Treatises of the Eye (book)
- Ishaq ibn Hunayn, Hunayn ibn Ishaq's son, also a translator and physician
- Galen § Influence on Islamic medicine
- History of medicine
