= Isagoge =

Textbook on Logic by Prophyry

The Isagoge (Greek: Εἰσαγωγή, Eisagōgḗ; /ˈaɪsəɡoʊdʒi/) or "Introduction to Aristotle's Categories", written by Porphyry in Greek and translated into Latin by Boethius, was the standard textbook on logic for at least a millennium after his death. It was composed by Porphyry in Sicily during the years 268–270, and sent to Chrysaorium, according to all the ancient commentators Ammonius, Elias, and David. The work includes the highly influential hierarchical classification of genera and species from substance in general down to individuals, known as the Tree of Porphyry, and an introduction which mentions the problem of universals.

Boethius' translation of the work, in Latin, became a standard medieval textbook in European scholastic universities, setting the stage for medieval philosophical-theological developments of logic and the problem of universals. Many writers, such as Boethius himself, Averroes, Peter Abelard, Duns Scotus, wrote commentaries on the book. Other writers such as William of Ockham incorporated them into their textbooks on logic.

== Versions ==
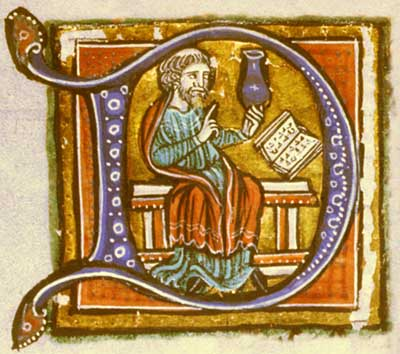
Iluminure from the Hunayn ibn-Ishaq al-'Ibadi manuscript of the Isagoge.

Arabic manuscript of the Isagoge

The earliest Latin translation, which is now no longer extant, was made by Gaius Marius Victorinus in the fourth century. Boethius heavily relied upon it in his translation. The earliest known Syriac translation was made in the seventh century by Athanasius II Baldoyo, the Patriarch of Antioch. An early Classical Armenian translation of the work also exists.

The Introduction was translated into Arabic by ibn al-Muqaffa‘ from a Syriac version. With the Arabicized name Isāghūjī, it long remained the standard introductory logic text in the Muslim world and influenced the study of theology, philosophy, grammar, and jurisprudence. Besides the adaptations and epitomes of this work, many independent works on logic by Muslim philosophers have been entitled Isāghūjī. Porphyry's discussion of accident sparked a long-running debate on the application of accident and essence.

== Predicables ==
The predicables (Lat. praedicabilis, that which may be stated or affirmed, sometimes called quinque voces or five words) is, in scholastic logic, a term applied to a classification of the possible relations in which a predicate may stand to its subject. The list given by the schoolmen and generally adopted by medieval logicians is based on the original fourfold classification given by Aristotle (Topics, a iv. 101 b 17–25): definition (horos), genus (genos), property (idion), accident (sumbebekos). The scholastic classification, obtained from Boëthius's version of the Isagoge, modified Aristotle's by substituting differentia (diaphora) and species (eidos) for definition (horos). The method of definition by diairesis, or differentiation, was known and practiced by Aristotle.

== Porphyrian tree ==
In medieval textbooks, the all-important Porphyrian tree illustrates his logical classification of substance. To this day, taxonomy benefits from concepts in the Porphyrian tree in classifying living organisms: see cladistics.

== Problem of universals ==
The work is celebrated for prompting the medieval debate over the status of universals. Porphyry writes:

For the moment, I shall naturally decline to say, concerning genera and species, whether they subsist, whether they are bare, pure isolated conceptions, whether, if subsistent, they are corporeal or incorporeal, or whether they are separated from or in sensible objects, and other related matters. This sort of problem is of the very deepest, and requires more extensive investigation.

αὐτίκα περὶ τῶν γενῶν τε καὶ εἰδῶν τὸ μὲν εἴτε ὑφέστηκεν εἴτε καὶ ἐν μόναις ψιλαῖς ἐπινοίαις κεῖται εἴτε καὶ ὑφεστηκότα σώματά ἐστιν ἢ ἀσώματα καὶ πότερον χωριστὰ ἢ ἐν τοῖς αἰσθητοῖς καὶ περὶ ταῦτα ὑφεστῶτα, παραιτήσομαι λέγειν βαθυτάτης οὔσης τῆς τοιαύτης πραγματείας καὶ ἄλλης μείζονος δεομένης ἐξετάσεως.

Though he did not mention the problem further, his formulation constitutes the most influential part of his work, since it was these questions that formed the basis of medieval debates about the status of universals. Do universals exist in the mind, or in reality? If in reality, are they physical things, or not? If physical, do they have a separate existence from physical bodies, or are they part of them?

== Bibliography ==
- Barnes, Jonathan (2003). Introduction to Introduction by Porphyry. Clarendon Press (modern translation of the Isagoge)
- King, Daniel (2010). The Earliest Syriac Translation of Aristotle's Categories: Text, Translation and Commentary. Brill
- "Porphyrii Isagoge translatio". Corpus scriptorum latinorum (in Latin). Archived from the original on September 2, 2003.
- Pearse, R. "Porphyry, Introduction (or Isagoge) to the logical Categories of Aristotle. Preface to the online edition". Manuscripts.
- Porphyry, Isagoge, translation by Octavius Freire Owen (1853)
- "MS 484/15 Commentum super libro Porphyrii Isagoge; De decim predicamentis at OPenn". openn.library.upenn.edu.
