= Ibn Abi Usaybi'a =

13th-century Arab physician

- Born: 1203; Damascus, Ayyubid Sultanate
- Died: January 1270 (age 66); Salkhad, Ayyubid Sultanate (in modern Syria)
- Resting place: Salkhad
- Occupation: physician
- Writing career
- Language: Classical Arabic
- Genre: Biography
- Notable work: Lives of the Physicians
- Literary movement: Islamic Golden Age

Ibn Abī Uṣaybiʿa Muʾaffaq al-Dīn Abū al-ʿAbbās Aḥmad Ibn Al-Qāsim Ibn Khalīfa al-Khazrajī (Arabic: ابن أبي أصيبعة; 1203–1270), commonly referred to as Ibn Abi Usaibia (also Usaibi'ah, Usaybea, Usaibi`a, Usaybiʿah, etc.), was a physician from Syria in the 13th century CE. He compiled a biographical encyclopedia of notable physicians, from the Greeks, Romans and Indians up to the year 650AH/1252AD in the Islamic era.

== Biography ==
Ibn Abi-Usaibi'a was born in Damascus, a member of the Arab Banu Khazraj tribe. The son of a physician, he studied medicine in Damascus and Cairo and In 1236, was appointed physician to a new hospital in Cairo, but the following year he took up an offer by ruler of Damascus, of a post in Salkhad, near Damascus, where he lived until his death. His only surviving work is Lives of the Physicians. In that work, he mentions another of his works, but it has not survived.

== Lives of the Physicians ==
The title in Arabic, Uyūn ul-Anbāʾ fī Ṭabaqāt al-Aṭibbā (Arabic: عيون الأنباء في طبقات الأطباء), is translatable loosely and expansively as "Sources of News on Classes of Physicians", commonly translated into English as History of Physicians, Lives of the Physicians, Classes of Physicians, or Biographical Encyclopedia of Physicians. The book opens with a summary of the physicians from ancient Greece, Syria, India and Rome but the main focus of the book's 700 pages is physicians of medieval Islam. A first version appeared in 1245–1246 and was dedicated to the Ayyubid physician and vizier Amīn al-Dawlah. A second and enlarged recension of the work was produced in the last years of the life of the author, and circulated in at least two different versions, as shown by the extant manuscripts.

=== Editions ===
The text has been published five times in all. When the first edition by August Müller (Cairo, 1882), published under the pseudonym "Imrū l-Qays", was found to be marred by typos and errors and a corrected version was subsequently issued (Königsberg, 1884). Relying on Müller's work, Niẓār Riḍā published a non-critical edition of the text in Beirut in 1965, which was subsequently reworked by Qāsim Wahhāb for yet another edition issued in Beirut in 1997. ʿĀmir al-Najjār published his own critical edition (not based on Müller) in Cairo in 1996.

A team of scholars from the universities of Oxford and Warwick has published a new critical edition and a full annotated English translation of the Uyūn al-Anbā. Their work is available in Open Access at Brill Scholarly Editions.

In 2020, a new translation was published by Oxford World's Classics under the name Anecdotes and Antidotes: A Medieval Arabic History of Physicians.

== See also ==
- Ibn Wahshiyya
