= Porphyry of Tyre =

3rd-century Phoenician Neoplatonist philosopher

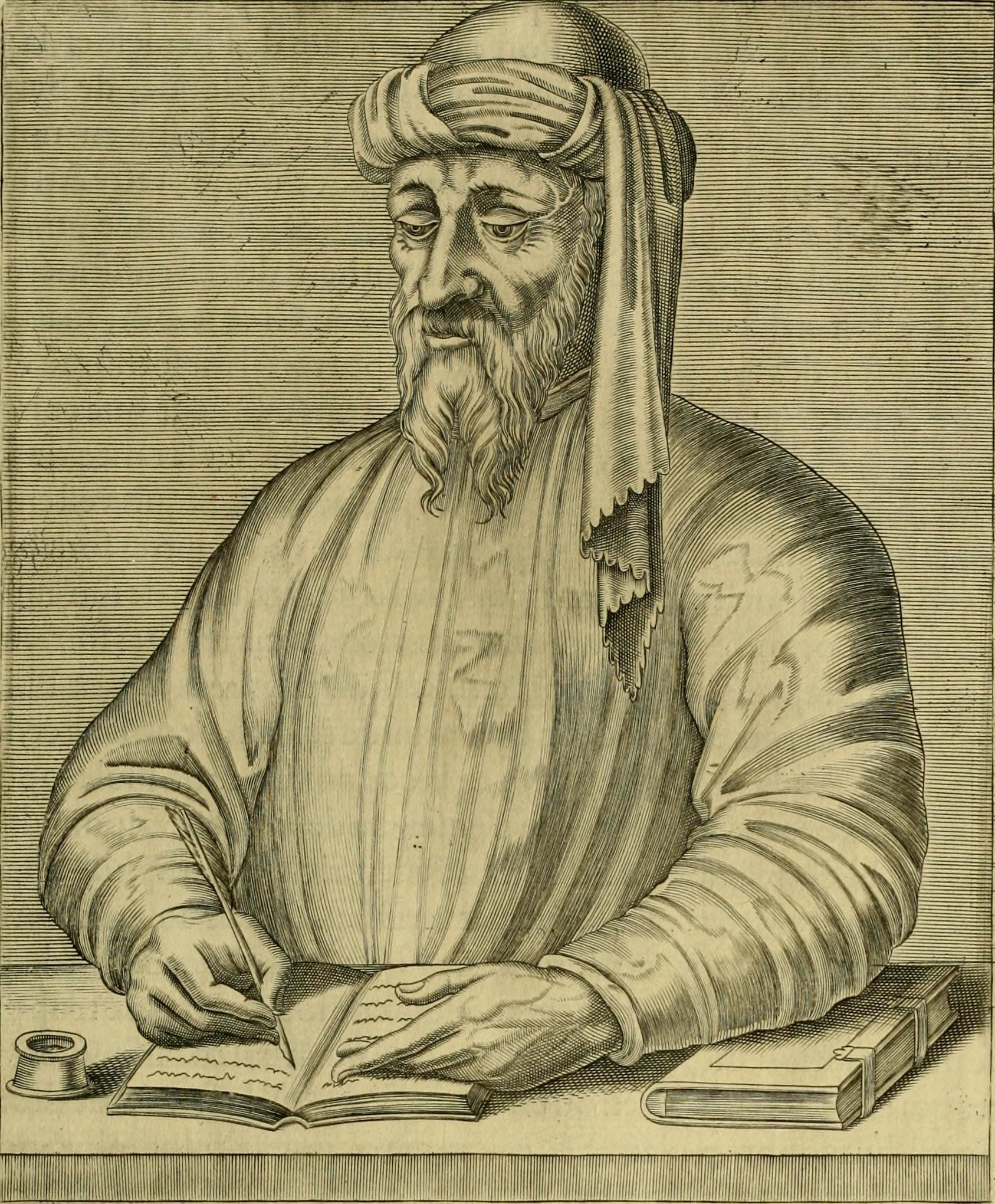
- Engraved depiction in André Thevet's Vrais pourtraits et vies des homes illustres, 1584
- Born: Malchus c. 234; Tyre, Phoenice Syria, Roman Empire
- Died: 305 (aged 70–71); Rome, Roman Empire

Education
- Academic advisor: Plotinus

Philosophical work
- Era: Ancient philosophy
- Region: Western philosophy
- School: Neoplatonism
- Notable students: Iamblichus
- Main interests: Metaphysics, astrology
- Notable works: Isagoge; Against the Christians
- Notable ideas: Porphyrian tree, criticism of Christianity, vegetarianism

Porphyry (/ˈpɔːrfɪri/; Koine Greek: Πορφύριος, romanized: Porphýrios; c. 234 – c. 305) was a Phoenician Neoplatonic philosopher born in Tyre, Roman Phoenicia during Roman rule. (Note: For Porphyry's dates, place of birth and philosophical school, see Barker 2003, pp. 1226–1227. Sarton 1936, pp. 429–430 identifies Transjordania as Porphyry's place of birth.) He edited and published the Enneads, the only collection of the work of Plotinus, his teacher.

He wrote original works in the Greek language on a wide variety of topics, ranging from music theory to Homer to vegetarianism. (Note: For a comprehensive list see Beutler (1894–1980); Guthrie 1988, p. 91 provides another list) His Isagoge or Introduction, an introduction to logic and philosophy, (Note: Barnes 2003, p. xv clarifies that the Isagoge "[was] not an Introduction to the Categories, rather "[since it was] an introduction to the study of logic, [it] was... an introduction to philosophy—and hence accidentally an introduction to the Categories.") was the standard textbook on logic throughout the Middle Ages in its Latin and Arabic translations. Porphyry was, and still is, also well known for his anti-Christian polemics, and for arguing that the Book of Daniel was pseudepigrapha written during the Maccabean period. Through works such as Philosophy from Oracles and Against the Christians (which was banned by Constantine the Great), he was involved in a controversy with early Christians.

== Life ==
The Suda (a 10th-century Byzantine encyclopedia based on many sources now lost) reports that Porphyry was born in Tyre, however, other sources report that he was born in Batanaea, present-day Syria. His parents named him Malchus (Μάλχος; cf. Aramaic malkā 'king'). However, he changed it to "Basileus" "King", and into his nickname "Porphyrius" "[clad] in purple" later in his life. In his work The Life of Plotinus, he refers to Aramaic as his "native tongue." Under Cassius Longinus, in Athens, he studied grammar and rhetoric, and became acquainted with Middle Platonism.

In 262, he went to Rome, attracted by the reputation of Plotinus, and for six years devoted himself to the practice of Neoplatonism, during which time he severely modified his diet, at one point becoming suicidal. On the advice of Plotinus he went to live in Sicily for five years to recover his mental health. On returning to Rome, he lectured on philosophy and completed an edition of the writings of Plotinus (who had died in the meantime) together with a biography of his teacher. Iamblichus is mentioned in ancient Neoplatonic writings as his disciple, but this is most likely only meant to indicate that he was the dominant figure in the next generation of philosophers succeeding him. The two men differed publicly on the issue of theurgy.

In his later years, he married Marcella, a student of philosophy and a widow with seven children. The Theosophia Tubingensis, a late-antique Christian apologetic text, presents his wife as Jewish, though this claim may have originated from Porphyry's own positive statements about Judaism, according to Pieter W. van der Horst.

There are around sixty works connected to Porphyry's name, some in fragments or lost. Some pieces of his work are still being reconstructed today. Little more is known of his life, and the date of his death is uncertain.

== Works ==
=== Introduction (Isagoge) ===
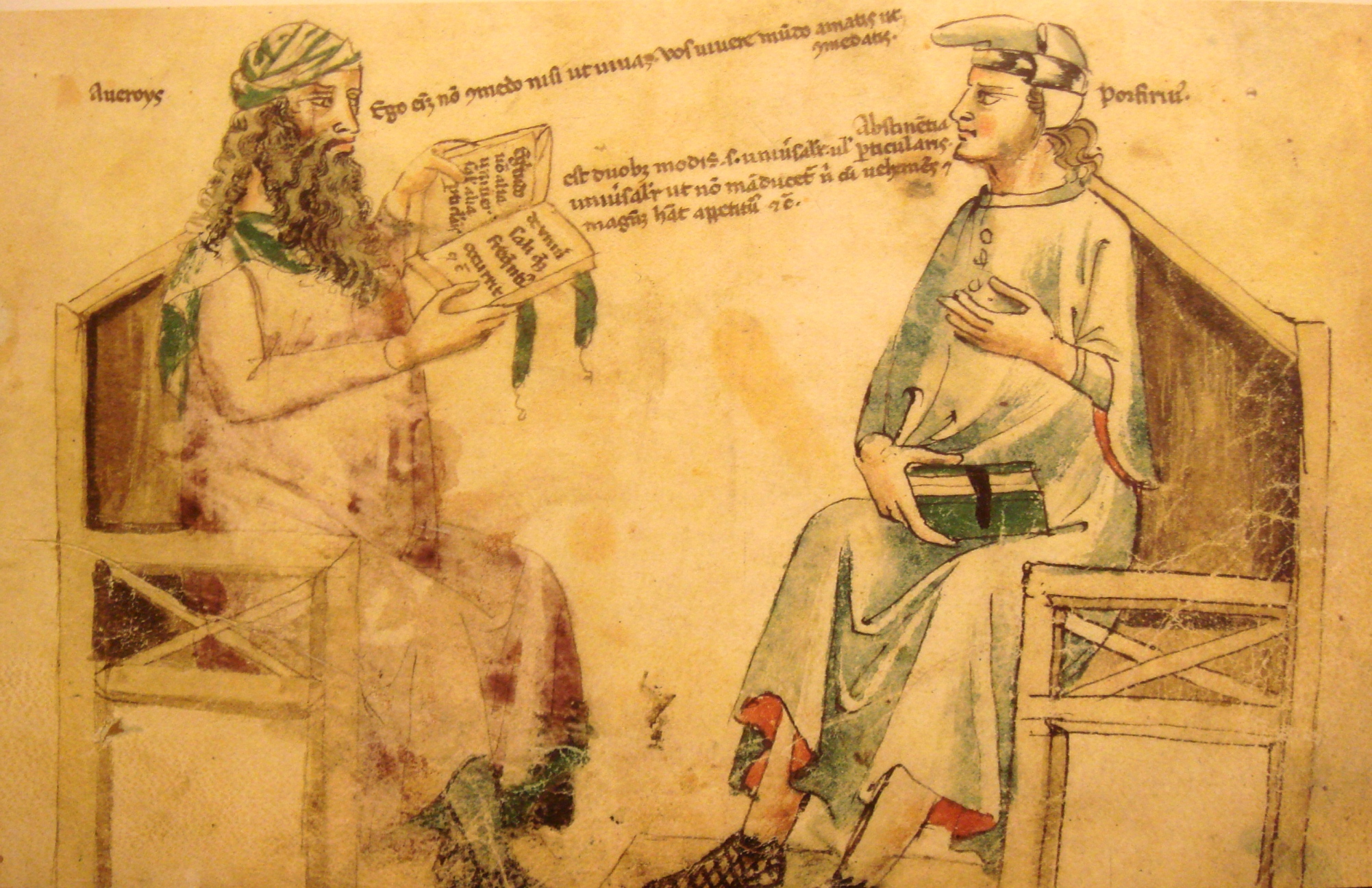
Imaginary debate between Averroes (1126–1198 AD) and Porphyry (234–c. 305 AD). Monfredo de Monte Imperiali Liber de herbis, 14th century.

Porphyry is best known for his contributions to philosophy. Apart from writing the Aids to the Study of the Intelligibles (Ἀφορμαὶ πρὸς τὰ νοητά; Sententiae ad Intelligibilia Ducentes), a basic summary of Neoplatonism, he is especially appreciated for his Introduction to Categories—also known in Latin as Introductio in Praedicamenta or Isagoge et in Aristotelis Categorias Commentarium—a very short work often considered to be a commentary on Aristotle's Categories, hence the title. (Note: Barnes 2003, p. xiv outlines the history of the opinion that Porphyry meant for his Isagoge to be an introductory work to the Categories.) According to Barnes 2003, however, the correct title is simply Introduction (Εἰσαγωγή Isagoge), and the book is an introduction not to the Categories in particular, but to logic in general, as it includes the theories of predication, definition, and proof. The Introduction describes how qualities attributed to things may be classified, famously breaking down the philosophical concept of substance into the five components genus, species, difference, property, and accident. Porphyry's discussion of accident sparked a long-running debate on the application of accident and essence.

As Porphyry's most influential contribution to philosophy, the Introduction to Categories incorporated Aristotle's logic into Neoplatonism, in particular the doctrine of the categories of being interpreted in terms of entities (in later philosophy, "universal"). Boethius' Isagoge, a Latin translation of Porphyry's Introduction, became a standard medieval textbook in European schools and universities, which set the stage for medieval philosophical-theological developments of logic and the problem of universals. In medieval textbooks, the all-important Arbor porphyriana ("Porphyrian Tree") illustrates his logical classification of substance. To this day, taxonomy benefits from concepts in Porphyry's Tree, in classifying living organisms (see cladistics). Porphyry's invention of the "Porphyrian Tree" is noted as the first proper commentary made on Aristotle's work.

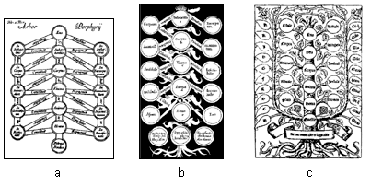
A replica of the Arbor porphyriana (Porphyrian tree) used to comment on Aristotle's work by Purchotius (1730), Boethius (6th century), and Ramon Llull (ca. 1305).

The Introduction was translated into Arabic by Abd-Allāh ibn al-Muqaffaʿ from a Syriac version. With the Arabicized name Isāghūjī (إيساغوجي) it long remained the standard introductory logic text in the Muslim world and influenced the study of theology, philosophy, grammar, and jurisprudence. Besides the adaptations and epitomes of this work, many independent works on logic by Muslim philosophers have been entitled Isāghūjī.

=== Philosophy from Oracles (De Philosophia ex Oraculis Haurienda) ===
Porphyry is also known as an opponent of Christianity and defender of Paganism; his precise contribution to the philosophical approach to traditional religion may be discovered in the fragments of Philosophy from Oracles (Περὶ τῆς ἐκ λογίων φιλοσοφίας; De Philosophia ex Oraculis Haurienda), which was originally three books in length. There is debate as to whether it was written in his youth (as Eunapius reports) or closer in time to the persecutions of Christians under Diocletian and Galerius. (Note: The Christian apologist Eusebius states that "some Greek" might say "How can these people be thought worthy of forbearance? They have not only turned away from those who from earliest time have been thought of as divine among all Greeks and barbarians... but by emperors, law-givers and philosophers— all of a given mind... And to what sort of penalties might they not be subjected who... are fugitives from the things of their Fathers?" This material, once thought to be part of Against the Christians, but reassigned by Wilken 1979 to Philosophy from Oracles, is quoted in Digeser 1998, p. 129. However, it may not have been by Porphyry at all.)

Whether or not Porphyry was the pagan philosopher's opponent in Lactantius' Divine Institutes, written at the time of the persecutions, has long been discussed. The fragments of the Philosophy from Oracles are only quoted by Christians, especially Eusebius, Theodoret, Augustine, and John Philoponus. The fragments contain oracles identifying proper sacrificial procedure, the nature of astrological fate, and other topics relevant to Greek and Roman religion in the third century. Whether this work contradicts his treatise defending vegetarianism, which also warned the philosopher to avoid animal sacrifice, is disputed among scholars. Due to Porphyry's work being incomplete or lost, the understanding of the piece could be misconstrued.

=== Against the Christians (Adversus Christianos) ===
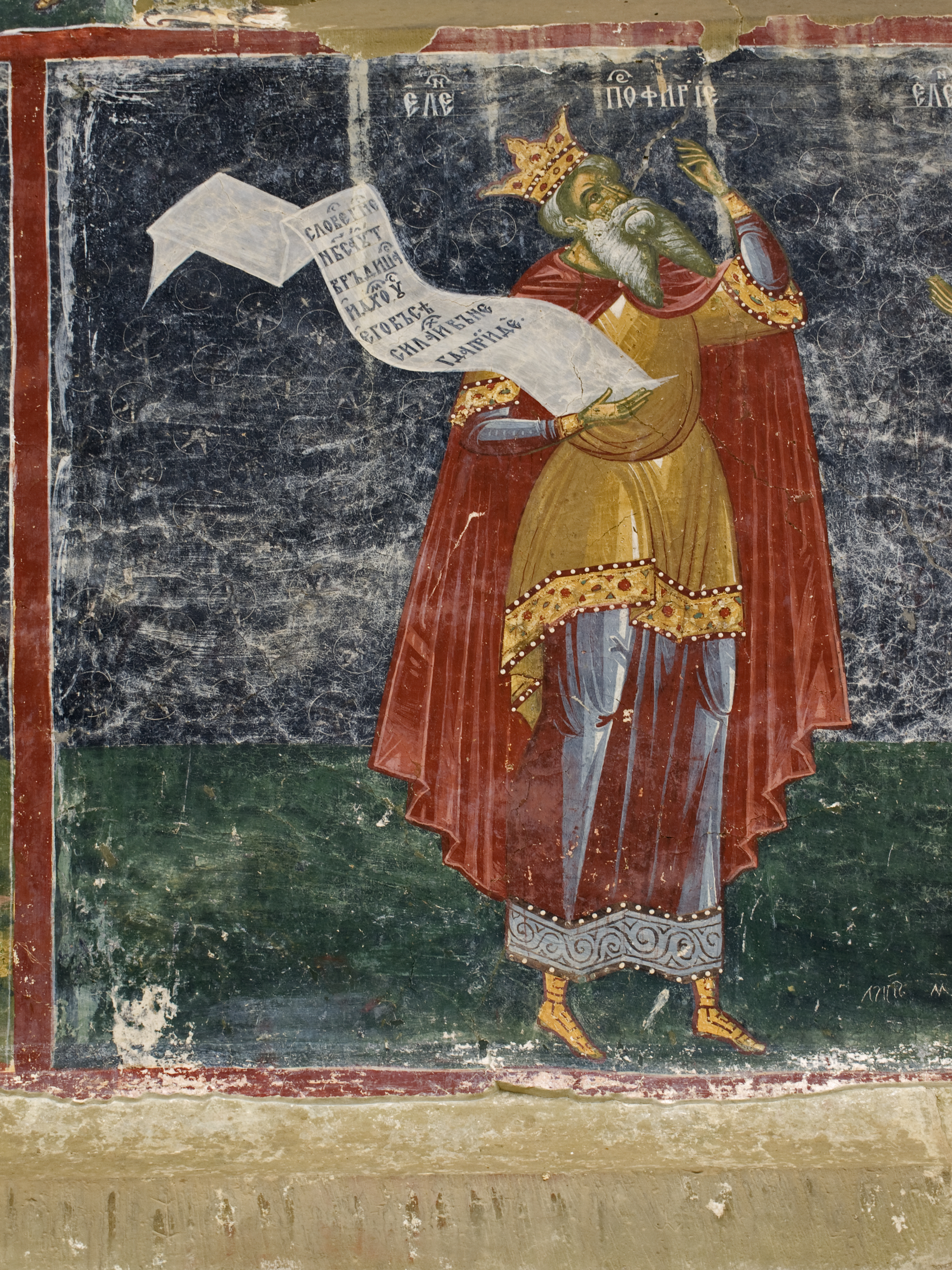
Porphyry, a detail of the Tree of Jesse, 1535, Sucevița Monastery.

During his retirement in Sicily, Porphyry wrote Against the Christians (Κατὰ Χριστιανῶν; Adversus Christianos) which consisted of fifteen books. Some thirty Christian apologists, such as Methodius, Eusebius, Apollinaris, Augustine, Jerome, etc., responded to his challenge. In fact, everything known about Porphyry's arguments is found in these refutations, largely because Theodosius II ordered every copy burned in AD 435 and again in 448.

Augustine and the 5th-century ecclesiastical historian Socrates of Constantinople assert that Porphyry was once a Christian. It is said, however, that while Porphyry did engage with Christianity, he did not believe it. Augustine made comments to Porphyry as he said he was the "most learned of the philosophers, as the most bitter enemy of the Christians".

=== Other works ===
Porphyry was opposed to the theurgy of his disciple Iamblichus. Much of Iamblichus' mysteries is dedicated to the defense of mystic theurgic divine possession against the critiques of Porphyry. French philosopher Pierre Hadot maintains that for Porphyry, spiritual exercises are an essential part of spiritual development.

Porphyry was, like Pythagoras, an advocate of vegetarianism on spiritual and ethical grounds. These two philosophers are perhaps the most famous vegetarians of classical antiquity. He wrote the On Abstinence from Animal Food (Περὶ ἀποχῆς ἐμψύχων; De Abstinentia ab Esu Animalium), advocating against the consumption of animals, and he is cited with approval in vegetarian literature up to the present day. He believed that everything was created for mutual advantage, and vegetarianism was a way to preserve universal harmony of nature.

Porphyry also wrote widely on music theory, astrology, religion, and philosophy. He produced a History of Philosophy (Philosophos Historia) with vitae of philosophers that included a life of his teacher, Plotinus. His life of Plato from book iv exists only in quotes by Cyril of Alexandria. (Note: Notopoulos 1940, pp. 284–293 attempted a reconstruction from Apuleius' use of it.) His book Vita Pythagorae on the life of Pythagoras is not to be confused with the book of the same name by Iamblichus. His commentary on Ptolemy's Harmonics (Eis ta Harmonika Ptolemaiou hypomnēma) is an important source for the history of ancient harmonic theory.

Porphyry also wrote about Homer. Apart from several lost texts known only from quotations by other authors, two texts survive at least in large parts: the Homeric Questions (Homēriká zētḗmata, largely a philological comment on the Iliad and Odyssey) and On the Cave of the Nymphs in the Odyssey (Peri tou en Odysseia tōn nymphōn antrou).

Porphyry's commentary on Euclid's Elements was used as a source by Pappus of Alexandria.

== On Judaism and Christianity ==
In his work Life of Pythagoras, Porphyry quotes the writer Antonius Diogenes, who wrote that Pythagoras visited the Egyptians, Arabs, Chaldeans, and Hebrews, from whom he learned the science of dreams. Eusebius likewise records that Porphyry mentioned "the wisdom of the Hebrews" alongside other nations known for their wisdom, attributing to Apollo the statement: "Only Chaldeans and Hebrews found wisdom in the pure worship of a self-born God."

In De antro nympharum, Porphyry quotes Numenius on the Jewish belief that "the souls rest on water, which is divinely animated," based on Genesis 1:2, whose traditional author, Moses, is referred to as "the Prophet." Elsewhere, in Ad Gaurum 11, Moses is instead styled "the theologian of the Hebrews," introduced in connection with Genesis 2:7, which states that "when the human body was formed and had received all of its bodily workmanship, God breathed the spirit into it to act as a living soul." In De abstinentia, he presents an abridgement of Josephus's The Jewish War 2.119–161, describing the Essene sect as semnotate, rendered "most august," and adds the bird-nest law from Deuteronomy 22:6–7 (or possibly drawing instead on Josephus, Against Apion 2.213).

Porphyry accused Christians of becoming "zealots for the strange mythologies of the Jews, which are in ill repute among all men," citing Genesis 2:17 as an example and asking why God would deny man not only the knowledge of evil, but of good as well." Elsewhere, however, Augustine reports that Porphyry credited the Jews with a theology superior to the Christian one. He also has Jesus justly condemned by "right-thinking judges", a motif shared with the Talmud.

== List of works ==
=== Extant ===
- Life of Plotinus. Editions: Luc Brisson, La vie de Plotin. Histoire de l'antiquité classique 6 & 16, Paris: Librairie Philosophique J. Vrin: 1986–1992, 2 vols; A. H. Armstrong, Plotinus, Loeb Classical Library, Cambridge, Massachusetts: Harvard University Press, 1968, pp. 2–84. Translation: Neoplatonic Saints: The Lives of Plotinus and Proclus. Translated Texts for Historians 35 (Liverpool: Liverpool University Press, 2000).
- Life of Pythagoras. Edition: E. des Places, Vie de Pythagore, Lettre à Marcella, Paris: Les Belles Lettre, 1982.
- Introduction to Aristotle's Categories (Isagoge). Translations: E. Warren, Isagoge, Mediaeval Sources in Translation 16, Toronto: Pontifical Institute of Mediaeval Studies, 1975; J. Barnes, Porphyry's Introduction. Translation of the 'Isagoge' with a Commentary, Oxford, 2003; Steven K. Strange, Porphyry. On Aristotle's Categories, Ithaca, New York, 1992; Octavius Freire Owen, The Organon or Logical Treatises of Aristotle with the Introduction of Porphyry. Bohn's Classical Library 11–12, London: G. Bell, 1908–1910, 2 vols; Paul Vincent Spade, Five Texts on the Mediaeval Problem of Universals: Porphyry, Boethius, Abelard, Duns Scotus, Ockham, Indianapolis: Hackett, 1994.
- Introduction to the Tetrabiblos of Ptolemy. Editions: Stefan Weinstock, in: Franz Cumont (ed.), Catalogus Codicum astrologorum Graecorum, (Brussels, 1940): V.4, 187–228; Kommentar zur Harmonielehre des Ptolemaios Ingemar Düring. ed. (Göteborg: Elanders, 1932). Translation: James Herschel Holden, Porphyry the Philosopher, Introduction to the Tetrabiblos and Serapio of Alexandria, Astrological Definitions, Tempe, Az.: A.F.A., Inc., 2009.
- Against the Christians (Adversus Christianos or Contra Christianos). Editions: A. Ramos Jurado, J. Ritoré Ponce, A. Carmona Vázquez, I. Rodríguez Moreno, J. Ortolá Salas, J. M. Zamora Calvo (eds), Contra los Cristianos: Recopilación de Fragmentos, Traducción, Introducción y Notas – (Cádiz: Servicio de Publicaciones de la Universidad de Cádiz 2006); Adolf von Harnack, Porphyrius, "Gegen die Christen," 15 Bücher: Zeugnisse, Fragmente und Referate. Abhandlungen der königlich preussischen Akademie der Wissenschaften: Jahrgang 1916: philosoph.-hist. Klasse: Nr. 1 (Berlin: 1916). Translations: R. M. Berchman, Porphyry Against the Christians, Ancient Mediterranean and Medieval Texts and Contexts 1, Leiden: Brill, 2005; R. Joseph Hoffmann, Porphyry's Against the Christians: The Literary Remains, Amherst: Prometheus Books, 1994.
- Commentary on Plato's Timaeus. Edition: A. R. Sodano, Porphyrii in Platonis Timaeum commentarium fragmenta, Napoli: 1964.
- Homeric Questions. Edition: The Homeric Questions: a Bilingual Edition – Lang Classical Studies 2, R. R. Schlunk, trans. (Frankfurt-am-Main: Lang, 1993).
- On the Cave of the Nymphs in the Odyssey (De Antro Nympharum). Edition: The Cave of the Nymphs in the Odyssey. A revised text with translation by Seminar Classics 609, State University of New York at Buffalo, Arethusa Monograph 1 (Buffalo: Dept. of Classics, State University of New York at Buffalo, 1969). Translation: Robert Lamberton, On the Cave of the Nymphs, Barrytown, N. Y.: Station Hill Press, 1983.
- On Abstinence from Eating Animals (De Abstinentia ab Esu Animalium). Edition: Jean Bouffartigue, M. Patillon, and Alain-Philippe Segonds, edd., 3 vols., Budé (Paris, 1979–1995). Translation: Gillian Clark, On Abstinence from Killing Animals, Ithaca: Cornell University Press, 2000.
- On the Statues of the Gods (Περὶ ἀγαλμάτων). Edition with translation: Irmgard Männlein, Mystik und Allegorese. Der Platoniker Porphyrios über Götterstatuen (Περὶ ἀγαλμάτων). Eine Studie zur spätantiken Religionsphilosophie [Mysticism and allegoresis. The Platonist Porphyry on statues of gods (Περὶ ἀγαλμάτων). A study of late antique religious philosophy]. Stuttgart: Steiner, 2024.
- On Philosophy from Oracles (De Philosophia ex Oraculis Haurienda). Edition: G. Wolff, Berlin: 1856; Porphyrii Philosophi fragmenta, ed. by Andrew Smith, Stuttgart and Leipzig, Teubner 1993.
- Aids to the Study of the Intelligibles (Sententiae ad Intelligibilia Ducentes). Edition: E. Lamberz, Leipzig: Teubner, 1975. Translation: K. Guthrie, Launching-Points to the Realm of Mind, Grand Rapids, Michigan, 1988.
- Letter to Marcella. Edition: Kathleen O’Brien Wicker, Porphyry, the Philosopher, to Marcella: Text and Translation with Introduction and Notes, Text and Translations 28; Graeco-Roman Religion Series 10 (Atlanata: Scholars Press, 1987); Pros Markellan Griechischer Text, herausgegeben, übersetzt, eingeleitet und erklärt von W. Pötscher (Leiden: E. J. Brill, 1969). Translation: Alice Zimmern, Porphyry's Letter to His Wife Marcella Concerning the Life of Philosophy and the Ascent to the Gods, Grand Rapids, Michigan, 1989.
- Letter to Anebo (Epistula ad Anebonem). Edition: A. R. Sodano, Naples: L'arte Tipografia: 1958.

=== Lost ===
- Ad Gedalium, a lost commentary on Aristotle's Categories in seven books. The testimonia are published in Andrew Smith (ed.), Porphyrius, Porphyrii Philosophi fragmenta. Fragmenta Arabica David Wasserstein interpretante, Berlin: Walter de Gruyter, 1993.
- A Treatise Concerning the Secret Doctrines of the Philosophers. Mentioned by Eunapius according to John Toland in "Clidophorus, or of the Exoteric and Esoteric Philosophy." Eunapius says that Porphyry "commended the medicine of perspicuity, and tasting it by experience, wrote "A Treatise Concerning the Secret Doctrines of the Philosophers", which they involv'd in obscurity, as in the Fables of the Poets, but which he brought to light."
- There is a fragment attributed to Porphyry in Shem-Tov ibn Falaquera's De'ot ha-Filusufim, from the 13th century. It is a Hebrew translation from an unknown Arabic translation of a lost work. Gad Freudenthal and Aaron Johnson tentatively accept its authenticity.

=== Uncertain attribution ===
- Ad Gaurum (of uncertain attribution). Edition: K. Kalbfleisch. Abhandlungen der Preussischen Akadamie der Wissenschaft. phil.-hist. kl. (1895): 33–62. Translation: J. Wilberding, To Gaurus On How Embryos are Ensouled, and On What is in our Power. Ancient Commentators on Aristotle Series, R. Sorabji (ed.), Bristol: Classical Press, 2011.
- #6 and #9 in Corpus dei Papiri Filosofici Greci e Latini III: Commentari – (Florence: Leo S. Olschki, 1995) may or may not be by Porphyry.

=== Editions ===
- Porphyrios, „Contra Christianos“. Neue Sammlung der Fragmente, Testimonien und Dubia mit Einleitung, Übersetzung und Anmerkungen [Porphyrios, „Contra Christianos“. New collection of the fragments, testimonies and dubia with introduction, translation and notes]. Matthias Becker. Texte und Kommentare, volume 52. Berlin, Boston: De Gruyter, 2016.
- Translations of several fragments are contained in Appendix 1 of Religion and Identity in Porphyry of Tyre by Aaron Johnson (Cambridge, 2013).
- Select Works of Porphyry. Translated by T. Taylor (Guildford, 1994). Contains Abstinence from Eating Animal Food, the Sententiae and the Cave of the Nymphs.
- Porphyrii philosophi fragmenta. Andrew Smith, Stvtgardiae et Lipsiae: B. G. Tevbneri, 1993.
- Porphyre: La Vie de Plotin [Porphyry: The Life of Plotin]. Luc Brisson et al. 2 volumes, Paris: Vrin, 1982–1992.
- Opuscula selecta. Augusts Nauck, ed. (Lipsiae: B. G. Tevbneri, 1886) (online at archive.org).

== See also ==
- Basilides of Tyre
- Macarius Magnes – his work Apocriticus contains a series of excerpts from Porphyry's Against the Christians
