= Olympiodorus the Younger =

6th-century Neoplatonist philosopher

Olympiodorus the Younger (Greek: Ὀλυμπιόδωρος ὁ Νεώτερος; born c. 495–505; died after 565) was a Neoplatonic philosopher, astrologer and teacher who lived in the early years of the Byzantine Empire, after Justinian's Decree of 529 AD which closed Plato's Academy in Athens and other pagan schools. Olympiodorus was the last pagan to maintain the Platonist tradition in Alexandria (see Alexandrian School); after his death the School passed into the hands of Christian Aristotelians, and was eventually moved to Constantinople. He is not to be confused with Olympiodorus the Deacon, a contemporary Alexandrian writer of Bible commentaries.

== Life ==
Olympiodorus was the disciple of Ammonius Hermiae at the philosophy school in Alexandria, and succeeded him as its leader when Ammonius died c. 520. He was still teaching and writing in 565, because in his commentary on Aristotle's Meteorology, he mentions a comet that appeared that year. Olympiodorus himself was able to survive the persecution experienced by many of his peers (see, for example, Hierocles of Alexandria), possibly because the Alexandrian School was less involved in politics (for example, the attempts by the Emperor Julian to re-establish Mithraic cults) and also possibly because it was more scholastic and less religious than the Athenian Academy.

He is called "Olympiodorus the Younger" or "The Younger Olympiodorus" in contemporary references because there was an earlier (5th century) philosopher also called Olympiodorus (Olympiodorus the Elder) who also taught in Alexandria.

== Writings ==
Among the extant writings of Olympiodorus the Younger are a biography of Plato, commentaries on several dialogues of Plato and on Aristotle, and an introduction to Aristotelian philosophy. Olympiodorus also provides information on the work of the earlier Neoplatonist Iamblichus which is not found elsewhere. The surviving works are:

- Commentary on Plato's Alcibiades (Σχόλια εἰς τὸν Πλάτωνος Ἀλκιβιάδην)
- Commentary on Plato's Gorgias (Σχόλια σὺν θεῷ εἰς τὸν Γοργίαν)
- Commentary on Plato's Phaedo (Σχόλια εἰς τὸν Πλάτωνος Φαίδωνα)
- Life of Plato (Βίος Πλάτωνος)
- Introduction (Prolegomena) to Aristotle's Logic (Εἰς τὰ προλεγόμενα τῆς Λογικῆς)
- Commentary on Aristotle's Meteorology (Εἰς τὸ πρῶτον τῶν Μετεωρολογικῶν Ἀριστοτέλους σχόλια)
- Commentary on Aristotle's Categories (Σχόλια εἰς τὰς Ἀριστοτέλους Κατηγορίας)
- Commentary on Aristotle's On Interpretation (Σχόλια εἰς τὸ Ἀριστοτέλους Περὶ Ἑρμηνείας)
- A polemical work against Strato.

In addition, a Commentary by Olympiodorus is extant on Paulus Alexandrinus' Introduction to astrology (which was written in 378 AD). Although the manuscript of the Commentary is credited in two later versions to a Heliodorus, L. G. Westerink argues that it is actually the outline of a series of lectures given by Olympiodorus in Alexandria between May and July 564 AD. The Commentary is an informative expatiation of Paulus' tersely written text, elaborating on practices and sources. The Commentary also illuminates the developments in astrological theory in the 200 years after Paulus.

== Spurious works ==
In addition there are three works ascribed to Olympiodorus, but which are now believed to be by other authors:

- An alchemical treatise concerning Zosimus' On the Action, called On the Book Kat'energian (On the action or According to the Action) by Zosimus and on the Sayings of Hermes and the Philosophers (Εἰς τὸ κατ' ἐνέργειαν Ζωσίμου, ὅσα ἀπὸ Ἑρμοῦ καὶ τῶν φιλοσόφων ἦσαν εἰρημένα)
- On the Divine and Sacred Art of the Philosophical Stone (Περί τῆς ἱερᾶς τέχνης τῆς φιλοσοφικῆς λίθου; Latin: De arte sacra lapidis philosophorum)
- A commentary on Plato's Philebus — now thought to be the work of Damascius
