= Category =

Category, plural categories, may refer to:

== General uses ==
- Classification, the general act of allocating things to classes/categories

== Philosophy ==
- Category of being
- Categories (Aristotle)
- Categoriae Decem
- Category (Kant)
- Categories (Peirce)
- Category (Vaisheshika)
- Stoic categories
- Category mistake

== Science ==
- Cognitive categorization, categories in cognitive science
- Statistical classification, statistical methods used to effect classification/categorization

== Mathematics ==
- Category (mathematics), a structure consisting of objects and arrows
- Category (topology), in the context of Baire spaces
- Lusternik–Schnirelmann category, sometimes called LS-category or simply category
- Categorical data, in statistics

== Linguistics ==
- Lexical category, a part of speech such as noun, preposition, etc.
- Syntactic category, a similar concept which can also include phrasal categories
- Grammatical category, a grammatical feature such as tense, gender, etc.

== Other ==
- Category (chess tournament)
- Objective-C categories, a computer programming concept
- Pregnancy category
- Prisoner security categories in the United Kingdom
- Weight class (boxing)
- List of software categories
- Categories (word game), a classic party game
- Saffir–Simpson hurricane wind scale, a common categorization of hurricane intensities
- Categories of New Testament manuscripts
- Network cable categories: 1, 2, 3, 4, 5/5e, 6/6a, 7/7a (F)
- A classification in a system of compartmentalization (information security)

== See also ==
- Categorical (disambiguation)
- Category 1 (disambiguation)
- Category 2 (disambiguation)
- Category 3 (disambiguation)
- Category 4 (disambiguation)
- Category 5 (disambiguation)
- Category 6 (disambiguation)
- Category 7: The End of the World
- Category A (disambiguation)
- Category B (disambiguation)
- Category C (disambiguation)
