= Dialectic =

Method of reasoning and philosophical argument

Dialectic or dialectics, also known as the dialectical method, is a method of reasoning and philosophical argument that emphasizes the progression of thought through a process of resolving contradictions. The term, rooted in the Ancient Greek dialegesthai ('to converse'), was popularized by Plato's Socratic dialogues, which presented dialectic as a discourse between two or more people holding different points of view about a subject but wishing to establish the truth through reasoned argumentation. In modern philosophy, dialectic has evolved into a distinct practice, often a systematic method of reasoning which seeks to establish a comprehensive framework for understanding development, change, and the interconnectedness of reality.

Throughout its history, the concept of dialectic has undergone significant transformations. In antiquity, it was developed as a form of "objective dialectic" by pre-Socratic philosophers like Heraclitus, who focused on the cosmic principles of change and the unity of opposites. This was followed by a "subjective dialectic" pioneered by the Sophists and Socrates, which shifted the focus to human consciousness and the art of argumentation. Plato elevated dialectic to the supreme method of philosophical inquiry, viewing it as the path to understanding the transcendent Forms. His student, Aristotle, redefined it as a method for critically examining reputable opinions (endoxa).

In the modern era, particularly within German idealism, dialectic was revived and systematized. Immanuel Kant conceptualized it as a "logic of illusion", identifying the inherent contradictions (antinomies) that arise when human reason ventures beyond the limits of possible experience. Building on Kant's work and the contributions of Romantic thinkers like Friedrich Wilhelm Joseph Schelling, Georg Wilhelm Friedrich Hegel developed a system of dialecticals, seeing contradiction not as a flaw but as the driving force of all movement and development. For Hegel, dialectic is both a method of argument and an ontology—the immanent process through which Spirit (Geist) unfolds and achieves self-consciousness.

Karl Marx and Friedrich Engels later reconfigured the Hegelian dialectic on a materialist basis, establishing historical and dialectical materialism. Influenced by the critiques of the Young Hegelians, they argued that the development of history is driven by the contradictions within the material, socioeconomic conditions of society, particularly class struggle. In the 20th century, dialectics was a central, and often contentious, theme within both Soviet Marxism and Western Marxism. Thinkers of the Frankfurt School, such as Theodor W. Adorno, developed a "negative dialectics" that resisted the reconciliatory and affirmative tendencies of the Hegelian system. In the latter half of the century, dialectic faced sustained critiques from analytic, post-structuralist, and postmodern traditions, which challenged its foundational assumptions. However, in response to contemporary global crises and the limitations of reductionist scientific paradigms, there has been a renewed interest in dialectic as a critical method for understanding complex dynamic systems.

== Etymology and definitions ==
The term dialektikē (dialectic) was likely invented by Plato himself, originating from the Ancient Greek dialegesthai, meaning "to converse" or "engage in dialogue". The word combines dia ("through" or "across") and logos ("reason" or "speech"), signifying a process of movement and mediation through reasoned discussion. The Oxford English Dictionary (OED) defines dialectic as "the art of critical examination into the truth of an opinion; the investigation of truth by discussion". The OED also notes that in modern philosophy, especially through the work of Immanuel Kant and Georg Wilhelm Friedrich Hegel, the term acquired more specialized meanings. In Hegel's philosophy, it refers both to the process of thought by which contradictions are resolved into a higher, more comprehensive truth, and to the "world-process" itself, which is seen as developing through a continuous unification of opposites. The editors of The Routledge International Handbook of Dialectical Thinking (2024) took the position that "no single, dominant definition or model of dialectical thinking currently exists".

Dialectic, according to Marxist writer John Rees, emphasizes three core principles: totality (the interconnectedness of parts within a whole), constant change, and contradiction as the engine of that change, with its general form being an "internally contradictory totality in a constant process of change". Psychologist Michael Basseches, who reviewed conceptions of dialectic in philosophy before empirically studying the psychological development of dialectical thinking in adults, defined dialectic in general as "developmental transformation (i.e. developmental movement through forms) which occurs via constitutive and interactive relationships". This definition ties together three concepts: change, wholeness, and internal relations. To illustrate, Basseches used the analogy of a road: non-dialectical "movement within forms" is like vehicles traveling between cities on an unchanging road, and dialectical "movement through forms" is like building a new and better alternative to a road when the road becomes inadequate.

Thinkers influenced by Marxism often distinguished dialectics or dialectical thinking from what they termed "metaphysics" or metaphysical thinking. As described by Friedrich Engels, "metaphysical" thinking considers objects and ideas as "isolated, ... fixed, rigid, given once for all", and thinks in "absolutely irreconcilable antitheses". In contrast, for Engels, dialectical thinking "comprehends things and their representations, ideas, in their essential connection, concatenation, motion, origin, and ending". However, this opposition between dialectics and metaphysics has been criticized by some non-Marxist thinkers as being inconsistent and as misleading because Hegelian or Marxist dialectics is a kind of metaphysics with a long history, namely process metaphysics, and what is presented by Marxists as a rejection of all metaphysics is better understood as the rejection of one kind of insufficiently processual metaphysics.

A widely circulated but often criticized formulation of dialectic is the triadic model of thesis–antithesis–synthesis, where an initial proposition (thesis) is negated by its opposite (antithesis), and the tension between them is resolved by a new proposition (synthesis). Critics like Karl Popper attributed this formula to Hegel, though scholars note that Hegel himself rarely used these terms and warned against reducing the dialectical movement to a "lifeless schema". Thinkers such as Marxist theorist Bertell Ollman argued that this formula oversimplifies the dialectical method, describing it as a "rock-ribbed triad" which misrepresents the dynamic and interactive nature of dialectical thinking. Instead, Ollman said, dialectic is "a way of thinking that brings into focus the full range of changes and interactions that occur in the world".

== Ancient philosophy ==
=== Ancient Eastern thought ===
Early forms of dialectical reasoning, often termed "spontaneous dialectic", emerged in ancient Eastern philosophical traditions, characterized by a holistic and dynamic perception of the natural world. This mode of thought developed from a direct, sensuous engagement with the world before the formation of specialized scientific disciplines and formal categorical systems.

The yin-yang symbol represents the unity of opposites and their dialectical interplay, a central concept in ancient Chinese thought.

In ancient Chinese thought, spontaneous dialectic is vividly expressed in the I Ching (Book of Changes), which uses a system of 64 hexagrams to symbolize the dynamic processes of change and the interconnectedness of all things. The core of this worldview is the concept of yin and yang, two opposing yet complementary forces (e.g., darkness and light, passivity and activity) whose interplay drives all natural and social processes. This relationship is not one of absolute opposition but of harmonious balance and constant transformation, where each force contains the seed of the other. Taoism, particularly in the Tao Te Ching, further develops this dialectic. It presents reality as a continuous flow (the Tao) in which opposites like "being and non-being", "difficult and easy", and "long and short" produce and define each other. Taoist dialectic is often described as a "negative dialectic" due to its emphasis on non-being, emptiness, and inaction (wu wei), which serves as a critique of dogmatic and artificial human constructs. However, the Chinese worldview prioritizes cyclical harmony over developmental struggle, conceiving of opposites as being in complementary balance rather than in an antagonistic conflict requiring transcendence.

In ancient Indian thought, dialectical themes appear in the earliest sacred texts, the Vedas. The Rigveda explores cosmic polarities such as light and darkness, order and chaos, and being and non-being, viewing them not as rigid binaries but as interdependent forces in a continuous process of becoming. Hindu cosmology, with its trinity of Brahma (the creator), Vishnu (the preserver), and Shiva (the destroyer), embodies a dialectical insight into the cyclical nature of existence, where creation, maintenance, and destruction are integral phases of an eternal cosmic rhythm. The Upanishads developed a form of negative dialectic to describe the ultimate reality (Brahman), which transcends all empirical attributes and can only be approached through the negation of all finite concepts (neti neti, 'not this, not that'). Buddhism further radicalized this negative dialectic with its concepts of emptiness (śūnyatā), impermanence (anicca), and not-self (anattā), which systematically deconstruct any notion of a fixed, intrinsic essence in reality.

=== Ancient Greece ===
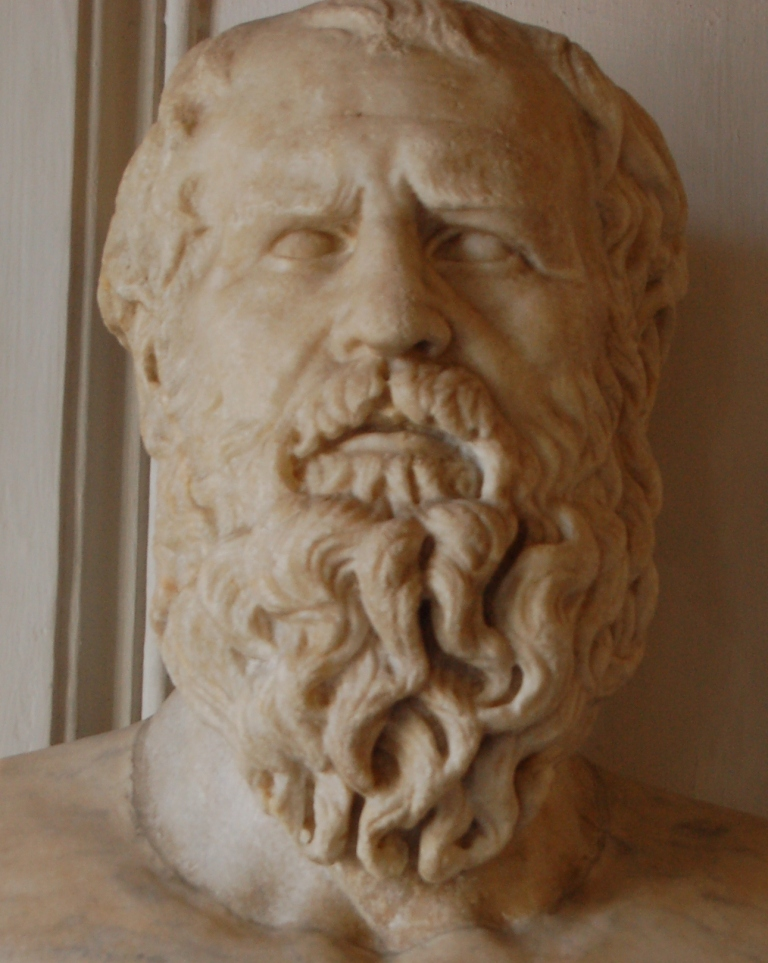
Heraclitus's philosophy, with its principles of universal flux and the unity of opposites, is considered the first clear formulation of dialectic in ancient Greek thought.

The emergence of dialectic in ancient Greece was intertwined with the transition from myth-based worldviews (mythos) to reason-based explanations (logos). Pre-Socratic philosophers began to seek the fundamental substance (arche) of the cosmos through rational inquiry rather than mythological narratives. The philosophy of Heraclitus (c. 540–480 BC) is considered the first clear formulation of a dialectical account of the cosmos. Central to his thought are the principles of universal flux, famously encapsulated in the phrase "everything flows" (panta rhei), and the identity of opposites. For Heraclitus, reality is in a state of perpetual change, symbolized by fire, and all things are generated and sustained through the struggle (polemos) of opposing forces, such as life and death, waking and sleeping, which he maintained are "one and the same".

In contrast, the Eleatics, particularly Parmenides, rejected the reality of motion and change. Parmenides argued for a single, unchanging, and eternal Being, accessible only through rational thought, while dismissing the sensory world of change as mere appearance or "Seeming". His disciple, Zeno of Elea, developed a series of paradoxes to demonstrate the logical impossibility of motion, employing a form of negative dialectic that revealed the contradictions in common-sense notions of reality.

A major shift occurred with the Sophists, who turned philosophical inquiry away from cosmology toward human subjectivity. Protagoras's famous thesis, "man is the measure of all things", grounded knowledge in individual perception and opened the path toward epistemological relativism and skepticism. The Sophists developed dialectic as the art of rhetorical argumentation (antilogikē), often employing it to scrutinize opposing arguments and demonstrate that contradictory claims could both be proven.

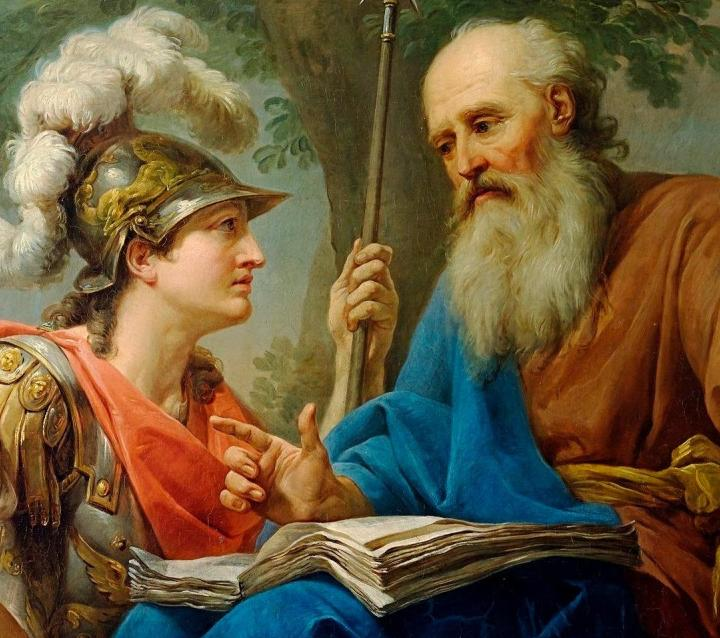
Marcello Bacciarelli's Alcibiades Being Taught by Socrates (1776)

Socrates repurposed this method into a cooperative search for truth. Viewing dialectic as the "art of midwifery", he aimed to give birth to new insights by analyzing and criticizing the thoughts of others. Through his method of questioning, known as the Socratic method or elenchus, he engaged interlocutors in dialogue to examine their beliefs, expose their unexamined assumptions, and lead them toward self-knowledge. Socratic dialectic was typically refutational (elenchic) and often ended in a state of perplexity, or aporia, where the interlocutors were forced to abandon their initial claims without necessarily arriving at a definitive conclusion.

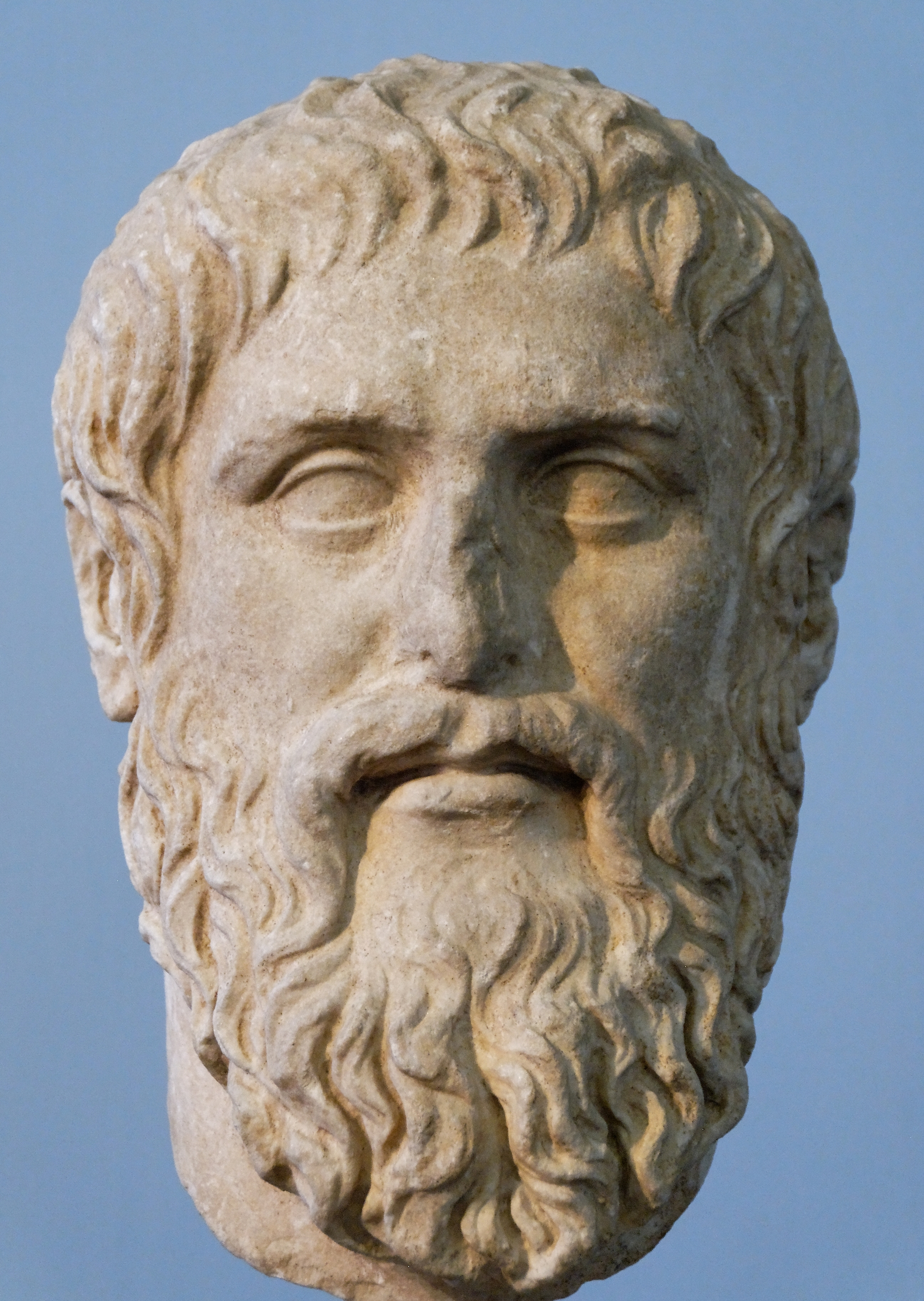
Bust of Plato

Bust of Aristotle

Plato, Socrates's student, systematized and elevated dialectic to the supreme method of philosophy, the "kingly art". His written dialogues are artful and artificial imitations of spontaneous Socratic discourse, which are both philosophical (dialectical) and dramatic in form. For Plato, dialectic is both a science of being and an art (technē) of asking the right questions to uncover truth, a rigorous intellectual process that enables the mind to ascend from the mutable world of sensory experience and mere opinion (doxa) to the eternal and unchanging realm of the Forms, where true knowledge (episteme) resides. This process involves two complementary movements: collection (synagoge), which gathers particular instances under a universal Form, and division (diairesis), which differentiates a Form into its constituent species. However, despite its dialogic form, Platonic dialectic is ultimately a directed, argumentative, and therefore monological process, in contrast to spontaneous oral dialogue.

Aristotle reconfigured dialectic, distinguishing it from both formal logic (analytics) and philosophy (the science of being). He defined dialectic as a method for reasoning from reputable opinions (endoxa) to test propositions and uncover the first principles of all inquiries. His major work on the subject, the Topics, presents dialectic as a systematic art (technē) of argumentation for use in stylized disputations. For Aristotle, a "Topic" (topos) was primarily a strategy, often based on a general principle, from which a dialectician could construct an argument for a given proposition. He organized these strategies according to the four predicables (definition, property, genus, and accident), arguing that the art of dialectic lies in mastering this "lore of predicables" to become proficient at finding arguments. By systematizing the argumentative methods found in Plato's dialogues, Aristotle's work represents a shift toward a more formal, logical, and monological conception of dialectic.

In the Hellenistic period, the Stoics integrated dialectic into logic as the study of argumentation and propositional structure, while Skeptics used it to suspend judgment (epoché) by setting out oppositions among competing dogmatic claims.

== Medieval and Renaissance philosophy ==
The development of dialectic from the late ancient period through the early Middle Ages was shaped by a gradual formalization of the Aristotelian art, a process that began with Aristotle's successor Theophrastus and was advanced by Cicero. Early Christian theologians like Tertullian were hostile to dialectic, viewing it as a subversive "art which destroys as much as it builds", while others, like Augustine of Hippo, recognized its value for theological discourse.

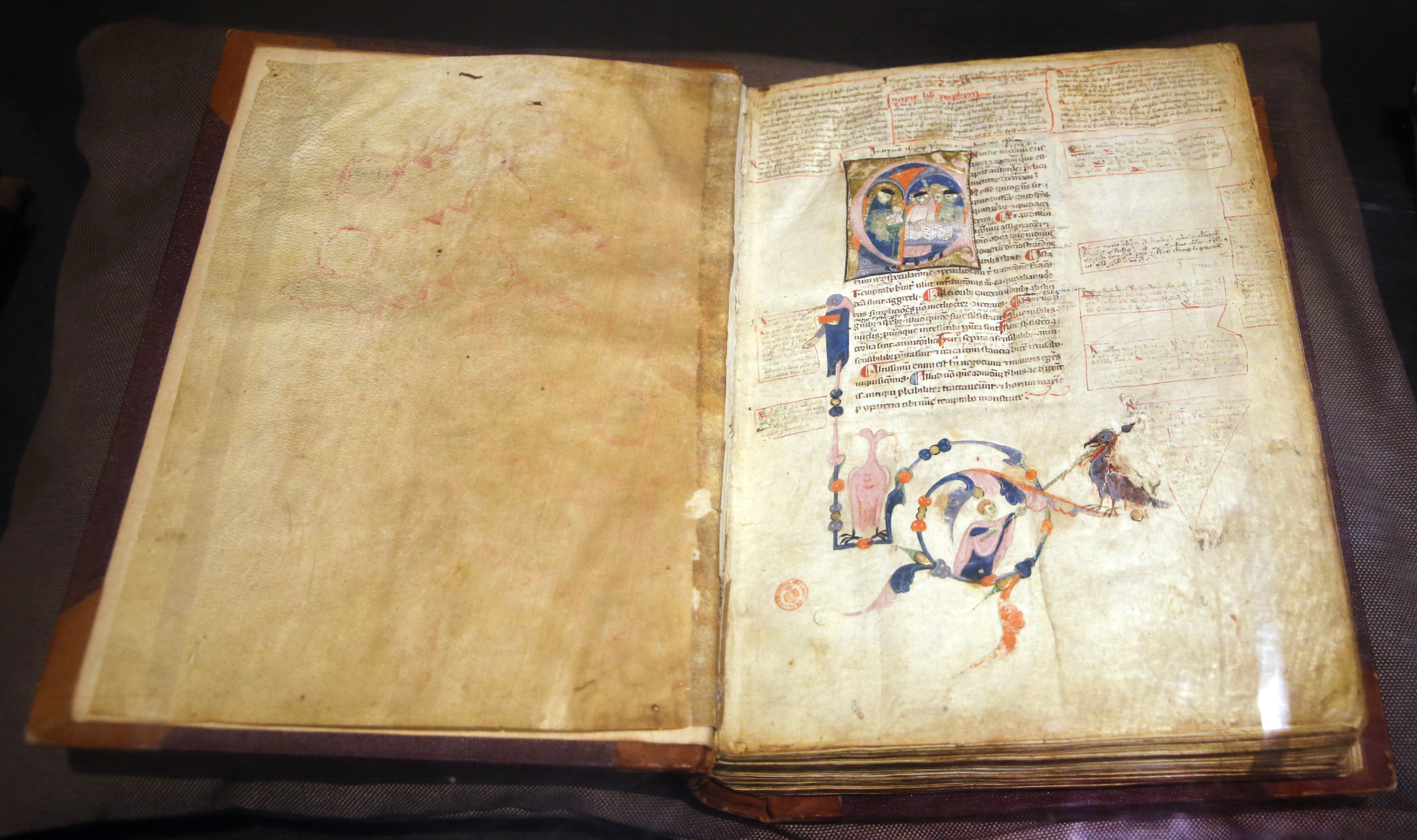
13th-century copy of Aristotle's Organon

The crucial figure in its transmission to the Latin West was Boethius, whose work on the Topics profoundly shaped medieval logic. In his treatise De topicis differentiis, Boethius systematized the art, distinguishing two kinds of dialectical Topics: the maxima propositio (maximal proposition) and the differentia. The maximal propositions were self-evident, universal principles that functioned as the premises or guarantors for the validity of arguments, while the differentiae were the practical tools for finding arguments, functioning as organizing concepts that helped the dialectician discover an intermediate term. This highly ordered Boethian framework became the foundation for the study of dialectic until the full rediscovery of Aristotle's Organon.

During the Middle Ages, dialectic was largely subsumed under theology and became one of the three liberal arts of the Trivium (along with grammar and rhetoric). The rise of Scholasticism saw a renewed engagement with dialectic as the central method for theological and philosophical reflection. Scholastic thinkers used dialectical reasoning in the form of the disputatio—a structured debate of questions and answers—to reconcile apparent contradictions between authoritative texts, particularly between reason (Aristotle) and revelation (Scripture). This period was marked by the intense debate between realism and nominalism over the ontological status of universals, a controversy that challenged the dialectical relationship between the particular and the universal. The narrowness of the Scholastic tradition's formalization of logic into a mere instrument for conducting verbal disputes and interpreting scripture ultimately led to its discrediting in the eyes of many early modern thinkers.

The Renaissance marked a significant transformation in the role and understanding of dialectic. Humanist thinkers like Lorenzo Valla and Rodolphus Agricola challenged the abstract formalism of Scholastic logic, advocating for a humanistic dialectic focused on practical communication and persuasion, more closely aligned with rhetoric. A more radical reappraisal came from Nicholas of Cusa, who introduced the concept of the coincidentia oppositorum (coincidence of opposites). He argued that the Absolute is the infinite ground in which all contradictions are reconciled, a notion that transcended the Aristotelian principle of non-contradiction. Giordano Bruno further developed this line of thought, proposing an infinite and ever-changing universe in which all beings participate in a continuous process of creation and transformation, thus challenging the finite, hierarchical cosmology of the medieval era.

== Modern philosophy ==
=== Metaphysics and the rise of modern science ===
The emergence of modern science in the 16th and 17th centuries, with its emphasis on empirical observation and mathematical precision, posed a challenge to traditional forms of dialectic. As Hegelians and Marxists later portrayed it, the analytical and reductionist methods of thinkers like Francis Bacon and Isaac Newton gave rise to a mechanistic worldview that treated nature as a system of discrete objects governed by unchanging laws. This "metaphysics" or "metaphysical" mode of thought, as Friedrich Engels later termed it, conceives of things in isolation and as fixed and immutable, standing in contrast to the dynamic and relational perspective of dialectics. (Some non-Marxist thinkers criticized this use of the term "metaphysical", arguing that dialectics is itself a kind of metaphysics, specifically a kind of process metaphysics.)

The dominant philosophical traditions of the early modern period, rationalism and empiricism, both contributed to this non-dialectical metaphysical orientation, in the view of later Hegelians and Marxists. The rationalism of René Descartes established a rigid dualism between mind (res cogitans) and matter (res extensa), creating a sharp separation between thought and the external world. This posed the central "psychophysical problem" of modern philosophy: if thought and extended matter are two absolutely opposed substances, their interaction within the human being becomes inexplicable. The Cartesian school could only resolve this contradiction by resorting to the intervention of God, a "capitulation before theology" that highlighted the limitations of the dualist framework. While Baruch Spinoza's monistic system, which identified God with Nature (Deus sive Natura) and posited that all determination is negation (Omnis determinatio est negatio), was considered "profoundly dialectical" by later Soviet philosopher Evald Ilyenkov, Spinoza's substance remained a static, eternal unity. The pluralistic universe of Gottfried Wilhelm Leibniz, composed of self-active "monads", introduced dynamism and the law of continuity, but their harmony was pre-established by an external principle.

The empiricism of John Locke, which portrayed the mind as a tabula rasa (blank slate) that passively receives sensory impressions, also reinforced a mechanistic and individualistic model of knowledge. The radical skepticism of David Hume, which challenged the concepts of causality and substance, exposed the limits of both empiricism and rationalism, leading to a crisis in metaphysics that set the stage for a revival of dialectic.

=== German idealism ===
German idealism developed new theories of dialectics. Its rise was a response to the perceived limitations of the Enlightenment's mechanistic materialism and a philosophical reflection of the social upheaval of the French Revolution.

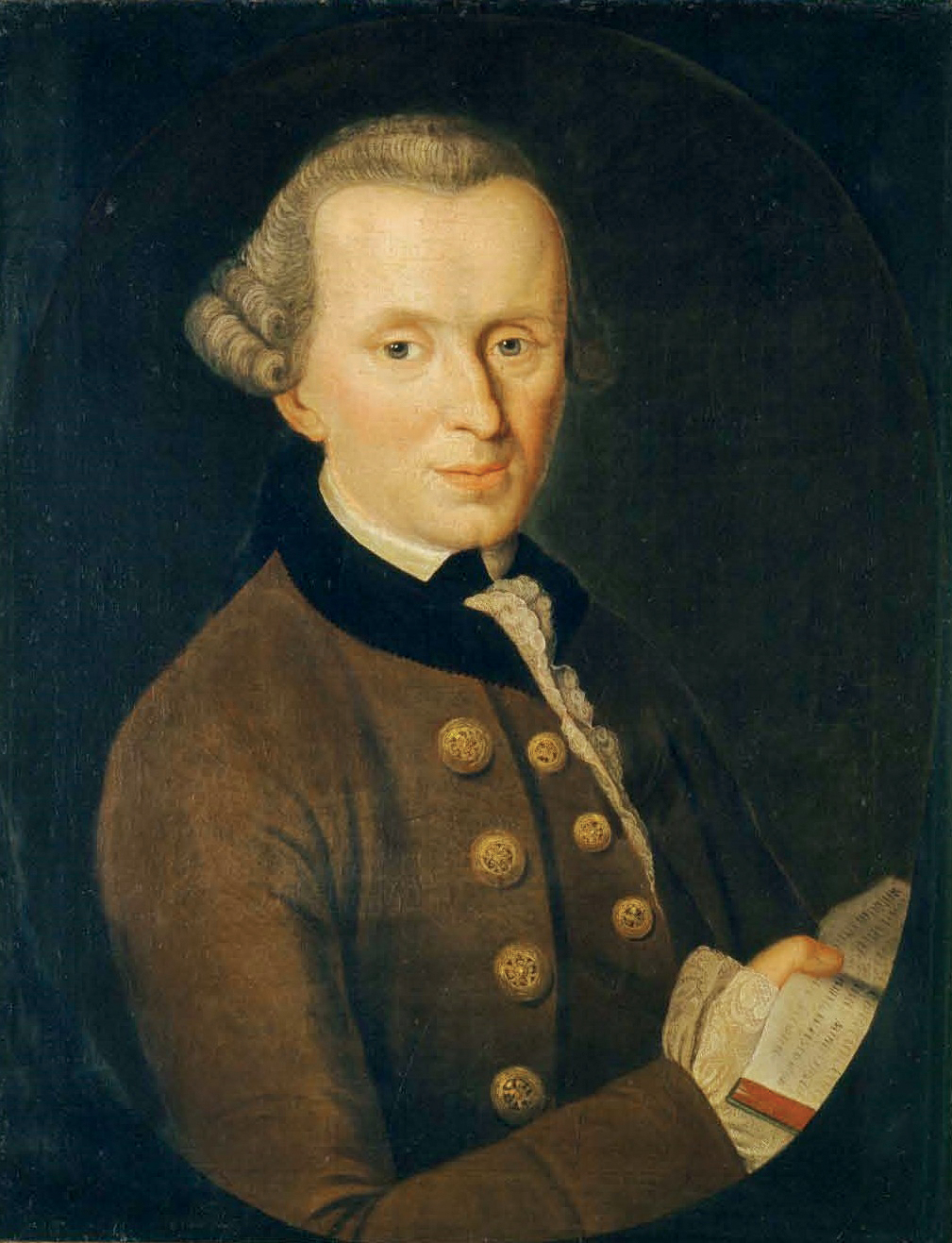
Immanuel Kant

Immanuel Kant, in his Critique of Pure Reason (1781), inaugurated this revival by re-conceptualizing dialectic. Seeing the state of philosophy in his time as a "war of all against all", he sought to establish a "legislation" for reason to resolve its conflicts. He held that universality was the pivot around which his theories of knowledge, ethics, and aesthetics revolved. While earlier philosophers had sought to use dialectic to attain objective knowledge, Kant argued that it was a "logic of illusion" (Logik des Scheins). He demonstrated that when human reason (Vernunft) attempts to go beyond the limits of possible experience to speculate on transcendent objects like the soul, the world as a totality, and God, it inevitably falls into contradictions, which he called the antinomies of pure reason. For Kant, dialectic's role is primarily negative: a "discipline of reason's critical self-purification" that exposes these illusions and delineates the proper boundaries of human knowledge. A key part of his project was a "transcendental logic" that brought the categories of metaphysics into logic as the forms of objectively valid synthetic judgments. Kant's system, however, rested on a fundamental contradiction: while claiming that sense impressions are caused by the action of the objective reality (the "thing-in-itself"), he also maintained that causality is a mental concept and not a property of the objective world.

Johann Gottlieb Fichte transformed Kant's negative dialectic into a positive, constructive method. He rejected Kant's notion of the unknowable "thing-in-itself" as logically contradictory and grounded his system in the activity of the self-conscious subject, or "I". For Fichte, reality is constituted through a triadic process: the "I" posits itself (thesis), is opposed by a "not-I" (antithesis), and the tension between them is resolved through a synthesis that makes both knowledge and practical action possible. His system began from abstract universality and proceeded towards the particular, with the ultimate goal of subjecting nature (the "not-I") to reason.

Friedrich Wilhelm Joseph Schelling extended Fichte's subjective dialectic to the objective world, developing a Naturphilosophie (philosophy of nature) that viewed nature not as a passive "not-I" but as a dynamic, self-organizing process. He saw nature and spirit, or subject and object, as two poles of a single, underlying Absolute, which he termed the "absolute identity". For Schelling, the universe unfolds through the interplay of opposing forces or "polarities", and contradiction is the essential driver of all movement and life. In Schelling's view, the Absolute was an "intellectual intuition" that was inaccessible to the conscious understanding. The standpoint of ordinary consciousness, which he termed "reflection", could only grasp reality in a fixed and static way, through the creation of "concepts", whereas the true standpoint of "speculation" could grasp the dynamic nature of reality.

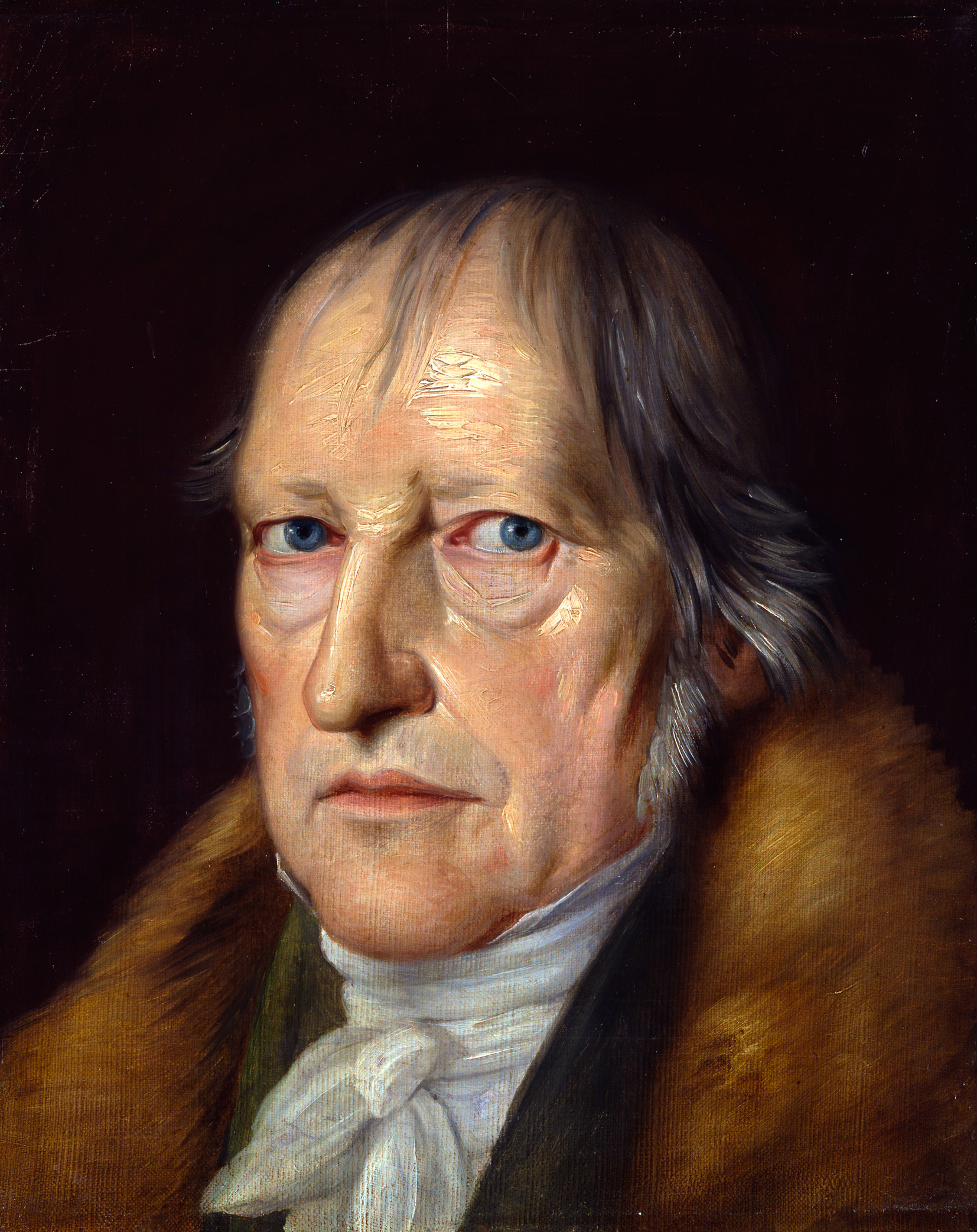
Georg Wilhelm Friedrich Hegel developed the most comprehensive system of dialectical logic, positing contradiction as the driving force of all reality.

Georg Wilhelm Friedrich Hegel brought the dialectical tradition of German idealism to its most comprehensive and systematic expression. He criticized his predecessors for leaving the opposition between subject and object, thought and being, unresolved. Hegel credited Kant with stressing the "un-voidable nature of dialectic" and its essential role in reason, but argued that Kant did not go far enough. For Hegel, dialectic is the immanent, self-driven movement of thought itself, and also the developmental process of reality as a whole. In his Phenomenology of Spirit (1807), he traced the development of consciousness through a series of stages, culminating in absolute knowing. In his Science of Logic (1812–1816, 1831), he laid out the structure of this movement through a system of logical categories. Central to Hegelian dialectic is the concept of contradiction, which he viewed not as a logical error but as the "root of all movement and life". Each concept or form of being, when examined, reveals itself to be one-sided and transitions into its opposite. The resolution of this contradiction leads to a higher, more comprehensive stage that preserves the previous stages in a process Hegel called Aufhebung (sublation), a term that simultaneously means to negate, to preserve, and to elevate. For Hegel, this concept, which captures the continual destruction and preservation seen in the transition of being into nothing and nothing into being, has its roots in Heraclitus's notion of becoming.

=== Marxist dialectics ===
Karl Marx "inverted" Hegel's idealist dialectic, re-founding it on a materialist basis as the theory of historical development driven by contradictions in the mode of production.

Karl Marx and Friedrich Engels adopted and transformed Hegel's dialectic, "inverting" it from an idealist framework into a materialist one. They rejected Hegel's conception of the self-developing Spirit as the motor of history, arguing instead that the development of human society is driven by the contradictions within the material, socioeconomic conditions. Their work was shaped by the evolution of Young Hegelian thought, particularly Ludwig Feuerbach's critique of Hegelian abstraction and Arnold Ruge's political demand for praxis.

Marx argued that Hegel's idealism committed a "double error": first, it dissolved the empirical world into abstract categories, and second, it was then forced into an "uncritical restoration" of that world, baptizing existing reality as the rational outcome of the dialectical process. For Marx, the dialectical method is not merely a way of describing the world, but a tool for revealing its transient, historical character and its potential for revolutionary transformation. In his words, dialectic "regards every historically developed social form as in fluid movement, and therefore takes into account its transient nature not less than its momentary existence ... it is in its essence critical and revolutionary". According to Bertell Ollman, dialectic is revolutionary because it "helps us to see the present as a moment through which our society is passing", forcing an examination of "where it has come from and where it is heading as part of learning what it is".

The philosophical foundation of Marx's materialist dialectic is his conception of human labor. He saw labor as the process that mediates between humanity and nature, the means by which humans consciously transform their environment and, in so doing, transform themselves. This provides a material basis for overcoming the dualism of subject and object, since labor is a unity of consciousness (the plan) and materiality (physical action). Marx's method, which came to be known as historical materialism, views history as a succession of modes of production, each with its own internal contradictions between the "forces of production" (technology, labor) and the "relations of production" (property, class structure). These contradictions lead to class struggle and ultimately to social revolution, which resolves the contradiction by establishing a new mode of production. In his magnum opus, Das Kapital, Marx applied this dialectical method to the analysis of capitalism. He began his analysis with the "cell form" of capitalist society—the commodity—and uncovered its internal contradiction between use-value and exchange-value. He traced how this fundamental contradiction unfolds through successive forms—money, capital, surplus value—to generate the systemic contradictions of the capitalist mode of production, such as the antagonism between the bourgeoisie and the proletariat.

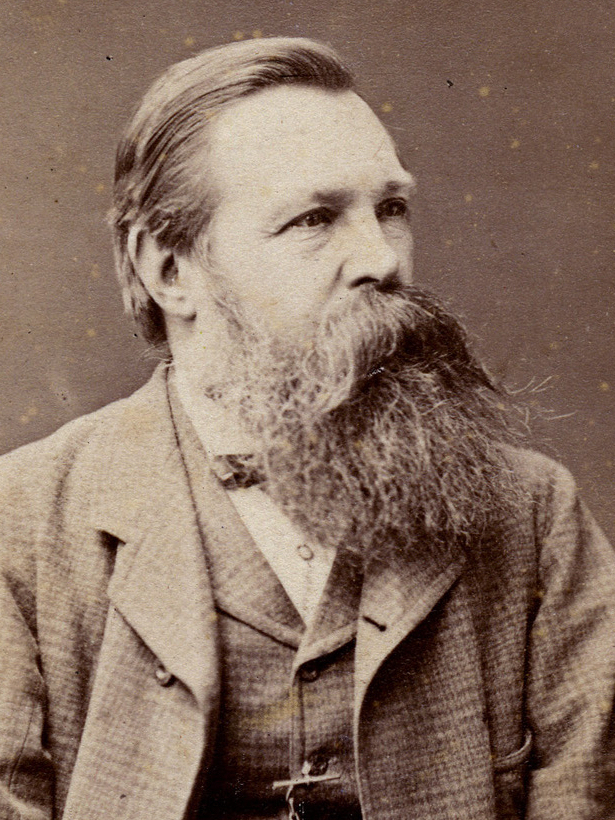
Friedrich Engels

A major line of development and controversy within Marxist dialectics concerns Engels's project of a "dialectics of nature". In his unfinished work Dialectics of Nature, Engels sought to demonstrate that dialectics is not only a law of social history and human thought but also a "real law of development of nature". His goal was to "rescue conscious dialectics from German idealist philosophy" and apply it to a materialist conception of the natural world, countering the anti-philosophical and metaphysical tendencies he saw among contemporary scientists. This initiative became the subject of the long-running "Engels debate". Critics argue that Engels's formulation universalized dialectics into a rigid, deterministic metaphysical system, thereby distorting Marx's more nuanced historical method. Proponents, however, view Engels's work as a crucial and consistent extension of their shared materialist worldview.

== 20th-century developments and critiques ==
In the 20th century, dialectics became a central theme in the development of both Soviet and Western Marxism, while also facing critiques from other philosophical traditions.

=== Soviet and Western Marxism ===
After the Russian Revolution, dialectics was institutionalized as the official philosophical doctrine of the Soviet Union under the banner of "diamat" (dialectical materialism). This was largely based on the works of Georgi Plekhanov, who, drawing on Engels, had established a system in which human nature was seen as a variable shaped by objective economic laws—which according to some interpretations was a departure from Marx's original view of a constant, self-actualizing social nature. The 1920s saw an intense philosophical conflict between the "Mechanists", who sought to reduce dialectics to the positive sciences, and the "Deborinites", who defended the Hegelian philosophical foundations of dialectics. This debate centered on the legacy of Engels's Dialectics of Nature, which was first published in the Soviet Union in 1925. Under Joseph Stalin, this official dialectic was dogmatized into a rigid and schematic set of laws, often used to justify political decisions. However, a tradition of "creative Soviet Marxism" continued, exemplified by thinkers like Evald Ilyenkov, who sought to revive a more authentic, Hegelian interpretation of Marx's dialectical method.

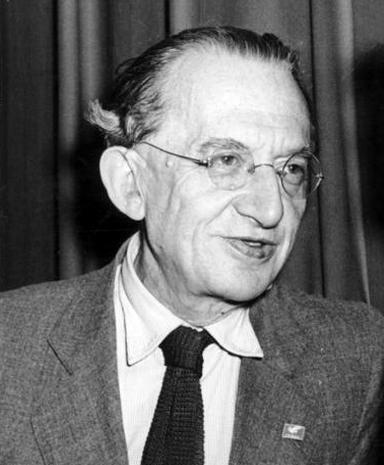
Georg Lukács

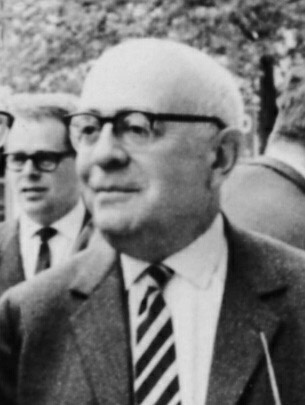
Theodor W. Adorno

In parallel, Western Marxism emerged in response to the defeats of European revolutions and the rise of fascism. Early Western Marxists like Georg Lukács, Karl Korsch, and Antonio Gramsci revived Hegelian dialectics as a critique of the mechanistic and deterministic Marxism of the Second International. Lukács, in a famous footnote in History and Class Consciousness (1923), initiated the Western Marxist critique of Engels, arguing that Engels had mistakenly extended the dialectical method to nature, a position that became a cornerstone of the "Engels debate". He emphasized the concept of totality and the identity of subject and object, arguing that the proletariat is the historical agent that can overcome the reification of capitalist society. The mid-20th-century Frankfurt School, particularly Theodor W. Adorno and Herbert Marcuse, developed a "negative dialectics". Reacting to the totalitarian outcomes of both fascism and Stalinism, they became deeply skeptical of Hegel's affirmative emphasis on identity and totality. Adorno, in his Negative Dialectics (1966), argued that thought must resist the drive to reconcile contradictions, instead focusing on the "non-identical" and the particular that escapes totalizing systems. In the late 1960s and 1970s, structuralist Marxism, particularly the work of Louis Althusser, rejected Hegelian dialectics altogether, defining it as an idealist "mystification" and seeking to establish Marxism as a positive science based on the concept of "overdetermination".

The development of the "New Dialectic" or "New Hegelian Marxism" in the late 20th century by thinkers such as Christopher J. Arthur re-emphasizes the importance of Hegel's Science of Logic for understanding Marx's method in Das Kapital. Its central thesis is the distinction between "historical dialectic" and "systematic dialectic". Proponents of this approach argue that many previous interpretations mistakenly conflated the two, leading to a deterministic and linear reading of Marx. Systematic dialectic, by contrast, is presented as a synchronic method for analyzing the structure of a given totality, such as capitalism, by tracing the logical development of its categories from abstract to concrete. The Neue Marx-Lektüre critic Michael Heinrich wrote in his Introduction to the Three Volumes of Karl Marx's Capital (2004), "More often than not, the grandiose rhetoric about dialectics is reducible to the simple fact that everything is dependent upon everything else and is in a state of interaction and that it's all rather complicated—which is true in most cases, but doesn't really say anything."

=== Analytic and postmodern critiques ===
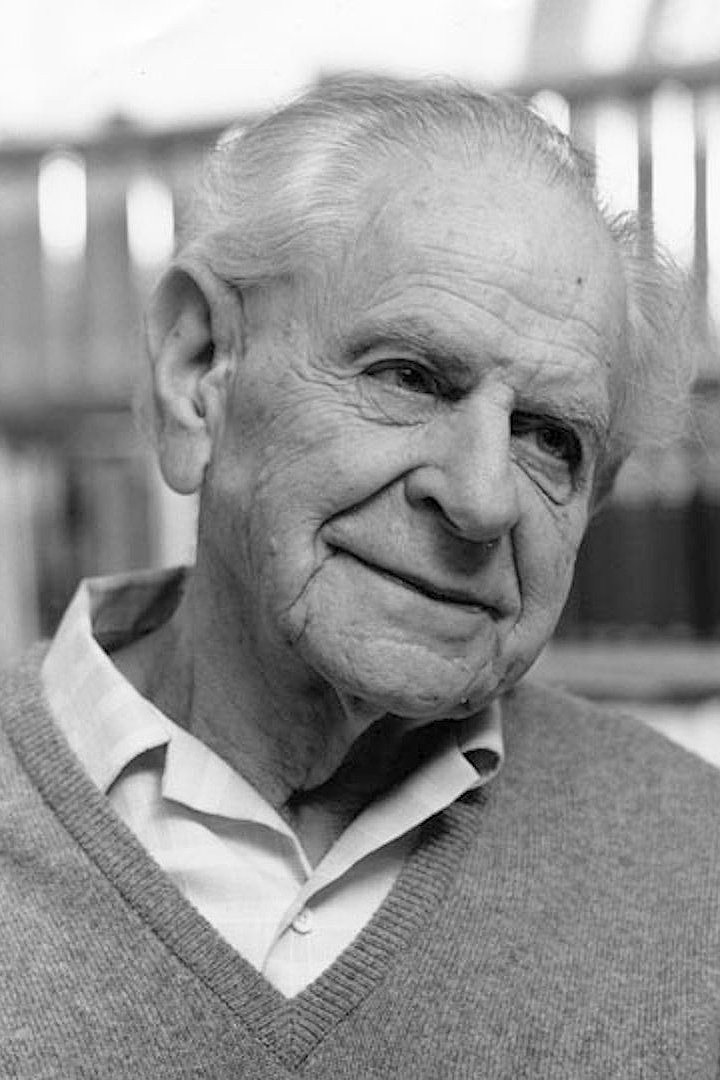
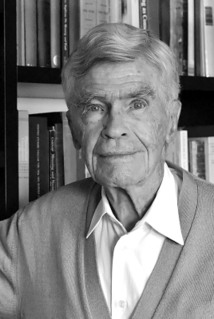
Karl Popper and Mario Bunge, 20th-century philosophers who specialized in scientific methodology, criticized Hegelian and Marxist dialectics as unscientific.

The analytic tradition, dominant in academic philosophy in the English-speaking world, was founded at the start of the 20th century with a strong rejection of Hegelianism, particularly by G. E. Moore and Bertrand Russell. In several works, Russell discussed Hegel's doctrines and dialectic as "interesting and instructive", but he dismissed them as largely "false" and based on logical fallacies. Karl Popper, influenced by the analytic tradition, mounted an influential critique of Hegelian dialectic in "What Is Dialectic?" (1937) and The Open Society and Its Enemies (1945), arguing that its acceptance of contradiction violates the fundamental logical principle of non-contradiction and renders it unscientific. For Popper, dialectic was a form of "reinforced dogmatism" that protected theories from falsification. Seventy years later, the analytic pragmatist Nicholas Rescher, who helped renew interest in dialectic in argumentation theory in the last quarter of the 20th century, responded that "Popper's critique touches only a hyperbolic version of dialectic", and he quipped: "Ironically, there is something decidedly dialectical about Popper's critique of dialectics." In 1940, around the same time as Popper's critique was published, pragmatist philosopher Sidney Hook discussed the "sense and nonsense in dialectic" and rejected two conceptions of dialectic as unscientific but accepted one conception as a "convenient organizing category". The physicist and philosopher Mario Bunge, also influenced by the analytic tradition, repeatedly criticized Hegelian and Marxist dialectics, calling them "fuzzy and remote from science" and a "disastrous legacy". Sociologist Poe Yu-ze Wan, reviewing Bunge's criticisms of dialectics, found Bunge's arguments to be important and sensible, but he thought that dialectics could still serve some heuristic purposes for scientists.

In the late 20th century, a different critique came from post-structuralism and postmodernism challenging the "grand narratives" of modernity, including Hegelian and Marxist dialectics. Drawing on Friedrich Nietzsche's skepticism, thinkers like Jean-François Lyotard, Michel Foucault, and Gilles Deleuze rejected the dialectical notions of totality, progress, and determinate negation. They argued that dialectic imposes a false unity and a teleological order on a world that is fundamentally characterized by difference, multiplicity, and discontinuity. For Marxist writer John Rees, Lyotard's deep pessimism is founded on a belief in an absolute gulf between knowledge and the world itself. Lyotard used the name "Auschwitz" to "point out the irrelevance of empirical matter" for any modern claims of human emancipation, Rees noted. Jacques Derrida's deconstruction aimed to dismantle the binary oppositions of Western thought by revealing the logic of différance, a process of endless deferral of meaning that can never be resolved into a final synthesis. However, critics have noted a paradox: in their attempt to "break with" Hegel, these thinkers often remain entangled in the very conceptual terrain they seek to deconstruct, using Hegelian tools to challenge Hegel.

== Contemporary relevance ==
Following the "end of history" proclaimed after the collapse of the Soviet Union, there has been a revival of interest in Hegelian and Marxist dialectics among some theorists. According to Manolis Dafermos, the persistence of global crises—economic, ecological, and political—has challenged linear, conflict-free conceptions of historical development and exposed the limitations of empiricist and reductionist paradigms. According to Dafermos, this revival reflects a growing understanding of dialectics as a critical methodological perspective for understanding and navigating the complex, dynamic, and contradictory nature of contemporary society. Marxist theorist Bertell Ollman argued that as society becomes characterized by "far greater complexity and much faster change and interaction", a dialectical understanding becomes "more indispensable now than ever before" for grasping the systemic relations that define it.

Within the analytic tradition, a "return to Hegel" has been noted, with philosophers like Robert Brandom and John McDowell re-engaging with German idealism to address the shortcomings of analytic atomism and foundationalism. The work of Wilfrid Sellars, with its critique of the "Myth of the Given", has been seen as resonating with Hegel's dismantling of "sense-certainty". The public intellectual Slavoj Žižek has also contributed to the renewed interest in dialectics, reinterpreting Hegelian and Lacanian thought to analyze contemporary culture and politics, although his "parallax gap" approach emphasizes irreducible splits over synthesis.

Across the sciences, there is a recognition of the inadequacy of linear, static, and reductionist models for explaining complex phenomena. According to Dafermos, dialectics offers frameworks for understanding some dynamic systems, emergent properties, and non-linear interactions. In physics, it has been argued that a dialectical model of reality is evident in concepts like the wave–particle duality in quantum mechanics. In biology, The Dialectical Biologist (1985), a book by biologists Richard Levins and Richard Lewontin, emphasized the interconnectedness of organisms and their environments, challenging genetic determinism. In the social sciences, dialectical models have been applied to study psychological development, educational theory, and the contradictions of global capitalism, such as the "metabolic rift" between human society and nature.

== See also ==
- Constructive developmental framework § Four classes of dialectical thought forms
- Chalybäus, Heinrich Moritz
- Conversation
- Dialectica – A philosophical journal
- De Dialectica – Various works on dialectics and logical reasoning
- Dialectical behavior therapy
- Dialectical research
- Dialogic
- Didactic method – Teaching method that may be contrasted with dialectical method
- Discourse
- False dilemma
- Logic and dialectic
- Lord–bondsman dialectic
- Reflective equilibrium
- Relational dialectics
- Tarka Shastra
- Unity of opposites
