= Topics (Aristotle) =

Works by Aristotle

The Topics (Ancient Greek: Τοπικά; Latin: Topica) is the name given to one of Aristotle's six works on logic collectively known as the Organon. In Andronicus of Rhodes' arrangement it is the fifth of these six works.

The treatise presents the art of dialectic - the invention and discovery of arguments in which the propositions rest upon commonly held opinions or endoxa (ἔνδοξα in Greek). (Note: These "commonly held opinions" are not merely popular notions held by the man-on-the-street about any and all subjects; rather, the dialectical ενδοξα are commonplaces of reason upon which those who conscientiously dispute (all men, most men, the wise, most of the wise, or the best known among the wise) agree in principle -- i.e. that which is "enshrined" (to borrow a cognate religious term) in opinion or belief among those who engage in disputation.) Topoi (τόποι) are "places" from which such arguments can be discovered or invented.

== What is a topic? ==
In his treatise Topics, Aristotle does not explicitly define topic, though it is "at least primarily a strategy for argument not infrequently justified or explained by a principle". He characterises it in the Rhetoric thus: "I call the same thing element and topic; for an element or a topic is a heading under which many enthymemes fall." By element, he means a general form under which enthymemes of the same type can be included. Thus, a topic is a general argument source, from which the individual arguments are instances, and is a template from which many individual arguments can be constructed. The word topic derives from ancient Greek tópos (literally "place, location").

== Connection to Aristotle's theory of the syllogism ==
Though the Topics, as a whole, does not deal directly with syllogism, clearly Aristotle contemplates the use of topics as places from which dialectical arguments (i.e. arguments using endoxa) may be derived. This is evidenced by the fact that the introduction to the Topics contains and relies upon his definition of reasoning (syllogismós): a verbal expression (logos) in which, certain things having been laid down, other things necessarily follow. Dialectical reasoning is thereafter divided by Aristotle into inductive and deductive parts. The endoxa themselves are sometimes, but not always, set out in a propositional form (i.e. an express major or minor proposition), from which the complete syllogism may be constructed. Often, such construction is left as a task to the speaker; Aristotle gives only the general strategy for argument, leaving the construction of propositions to the creativity of the answerer.

== Book I ==
Book I is introductory, laying down a number of preliminary principles upon which dialectical argumentation proceeds. Aristotle first lists out five types of endoxa which one can begin reasoning from:

- the views of everyone;
- the views of the preponderant majority;
- the views of the recognized experts;
- the views of all the experts;
- the views of the most famous.

Aristotle then defines three types of reasoning in an argument:

- Dialectical - reasoning from opinions generally accepted
- Demonstrative - reasoning from premises that are true and primary, or from knowledge coming through those premises
- Contentious - reasoning from opinions that only seem to be generally accepted but are not really

Aristotle proceeds to note the utility of the art of dialectic, then presents four materials used in dialectical argument: accident (or incidental), property, genus, and definition. He also explains the various senses of sameness, that bear directly upon the character of arguments, as follows.

- Number (the referent has more than one name, like doublet and cloak)
- Specifically (the same species)
- Generally (the same genus)

Then, the means (organa) by which arguments may be obtained are described:

1. securing propositions
2. figuring out the number of senses of a term
3. finding differences
4. investigating similarity

Methods and rationale for attaining each of these ends are briefly illustrated and explained. In particular, there is an analysis of how to find the different senses of a term.

- Contraries (the opposite of sharp is flat, which might refer to notes or solid edges)
- Sometimes words are ambiguous (the opposite of love is hate, but the physical activity of love has no opposite)
- Differences of kind (a clear color versus a clear sound)
- In relation to the deprivation or presence of a state (states such as when using your senses)
- Inflected forms (if "justify" has more than one sense, then so will "justly")
- Signified predicates (good food signifies something different from good medicine)
- Distinct genera (for example, river bank versus a bank the institution)
- Comparability (a sharp note can't be more sharp than a sharp flavor)
- Distinct differentia (sharp note, sharp flavor, different differentiae)
- As species or differentia (color of a body, versus clarity of a note)

== Book II ==
Book II is devoted to topics relating to arguments where an "accident" (i.e. non-essential attribute, or an incidental attribute) is predicated of a subject.

There are important considerations when dealing with these arguments. Is something called accidental when it should be ascribed differently? Examine cases where a predicate has been asserted or denied universally to belong to something. Define terms, even accidental terms. Define what you think should be called by what most people call them. The reason is that sometimes you need the definition a doctor uses, sometimes the definition used by most people. You can also alter terms into more familiar ones so that the thesis becomes easier to attack.

Sometimes, opponents should be drawn to make statements that you can easily respond to. This is necessary when the answerer has denied useful statements for you to attack the thesis. It is apparently necessary when someone makes a derivative statement. It is not necessary in any sense when the opponent has made statements that are unrelated to the thesis, and you should concede the point if it's true because it makes no difference to the thesis anyway.

Recognizing if an accident belongs to a subject is also important. If the accident increases along with an increase in the subject, then the accident belongs to the subject. For example, if more pleasure means more good, then pleasure belongs to the good. If a thing doesn't possess an attribute, and the addition of something else makes it possess that attribute, then the added thing possesses the attribute and imparts it on the new thing. If a dish isn't spicy, then it becomes spicy after adding pepper, then pepper possesses spicy.

== Book III ==
Book III concerns topics that can be discussed with respect to better or worse.

Desirability and the good are treated as the subject of "better". Remember that these statements are in relation to arguments about what most people accept is the case, as in all of Topics. What is lasting is more desirable than what is less lasting. What an expert would choose, or what in general most people would choose, is more desirable. What is desired for itself is more desirable than what is desirable incidentally. The cause of good is more desirable than what happens incidentally. What is good absolutely is more desirable than what is good in particular.

Consequences are another way to judge desirability. When something is of the greater consequence relative to the context, such as age of the speaker, it is more desirable.

Similarity to other things that are desirable can help, but not always. You could argue that Ajax is better than Odysseus because Ajax is more like Achilles. Ajax might not resemble Achilles on the relevant points. If man is the most beautiful, and monkeys resemble man more than horses, somebody might say that monkeys are more handsome than horses. But horses can still be more beautiful than monkeys in the relevant ways.

== Book IV ==
Book IV deals with genus — how it is discovered and the sources of argument for and against attribution of a genus.

Aristotle points out a number of errors that arguers make about genus relating genus to species. Some of these topics are as follows, phrased as questions:

- Does the genus partake in the subject? Only the species should partake in the genus. Man partakes in animal, but animal does not partake in man.
- Is anything true of the species that is not true of the genus? An object of knowledge cannot be a genus of opinion because opinions are sometimes of things that don't exist, but this is not true of any object of knowledge.
- Does the genus denote more than the species? For instance, there are of course more animals than there are dogs.
- Is the genus put inside the species? Animals are not a type of dog, rather, dogs are a type of animal.
- Can the thing placed in a genus partake with a contrary of the genus? This would not be possible.

There are also considerations to make about genus relating to states and deprivations.

- The genus that contains extremes also contains the intermediaries. But defect and excess are in the same genus as evil, yet the mean is good, so in this case, the genus does not contain the intermediary. But this topic often works.
- If the opposite of the species is a deprivation, then the deprivation is not in the genus. Blindness is not a form of sensation.
- Does the relationship remain when a term is called by the name of its genus?
- Is a state placed in a genus that is an activity, or is an activity placed inside a state that is a genus? A state of focus is not the activity of thought. Memory is an active process but is not itself a state of focus.

Then there are considerations to make about genus relating to differentia.

- Sometimes people reverse differentia with genus. If astonishment is defined as excess of wonderment, and excess is treated as genus while wonderment is treated as differentia. But if excess is a genus, then even some inanimate things could have astonishment!
- Is the differentia being labeled as a genus? Immortality could distinguish living beings, but it cannot be a genus. Differentia doesn't signify essence, only quality.

Importantly, you can distinguish genus from differentia by looking to see that the genus has a wider denotation, that the essence is stated for the genus, and that the differentia signifies a quality.

Lastly, there is a topic about affectation. That which is affected should not be in a genus of what affects or the other way around. Air is affected by wind (it is made to move a certain way) but that doesn't mean that wind is a type of air, or that air is a type of wind. Wind is not "air in motion", but the movement of air.

== Book V ==
Book V discusses the topic of property—that which is attributable only to a particular subject and is not an essential attribute.

Property is subdivided in four ways.

- Essential - rendered in comparison with everything else and distinguishes the thing from everything else, like "capability of receiving knowledge" in man
- Permanent - true every time, like living things always consisting of soul and body
- Relative - separates its subject off not from everything else but only from a particular definite thing
- Temporary - true at some particular time, and does not always follow, like a particular man walking in a market

In addition to these distinctions, intelligibility of the alleged property is an important topic. A property is rendered correctly when the terms used to state the property are more intelligible than the property, or if the subject is more intelligible. Intelligible here is something more immediately understood. The following questions can help identify intelligibility.

- Has the same term being repeated in the property? This is like using the word in the definition.
- Is the person rendering more than one property of the same thing on purpose? If not, there is no reason for this.
- Is the subject or species used to render a property? If so, the subject has not been made more intelligible; A property of animal would not properly be "what man belongs to as a species".
- Is the opposite, or anything simultaneous or posterior with the subject, used to render a property? This would not make the subject more intelligible.
- Is the appropriateness of a property only obvious by sensation? This would make things uncertain and not necessarily follow. Noting this is useful for breaking apart arguments.

Some topics are quite unique.

- Is a thing declared to be a property of itself, and true of the whole but not the parts? This would not be a property properly rendered. It can be proper to consider parts of the ocean as a property of the ocean, in the sense that they are just more ocean. But it would not be proper if that portion of ocean was not true of the whole.
- Does the contrary term fail to be a property of the contrary subject?
- Does the property described in terms of a state fail to be a property of the state? Then the opposite property is not a property of deprivation of the state. Lack of sensation is not a property of deafness, and therefore equally, sensation is not a property of hearing; although both deal with sound, hearing as a state is a capacity to act but not itself a sensation.

There are also some topics more particular to relational properties.

- For a property in relation like that of the property rendered, does it belong to the subject in the same way as the rendered property with its subject? If doctor is to ability to produce health, and trainer is to the ability to produce vigor, then the ability to produce health is a property of doctor.
- If what is more P fails to be a property of what is more S, then what is less P cannot be a property of what is less S. Higher sensation is a property of higher degrees of life, lesser sensation is a property of lesser degrees of life.

Lastly, Aristotle notes that superlatives cannot be properties, because as soon as the thing perishes, the superlative could apply to something totally new.

== Book VI ==
Book VI describes definition and the numerous means that may be used to attack and defend a definition.

There are five parts to discussing definitions, phrased in terms of looking to defeat one's opponents.

1. Show that the definition cannot be applied to every object it is meant to apply to. The definition of man should be true of every man.
2. Show that though the object has a genus, the opponent has failed to put the defined object into the genus, or to put it into the appropriate genus. The person creating a definition should first place the object in its genus, and then add the differentia.
3. Show that the expression is not unique to the object. A definition should be unique.
4. See if, in addition to everything else, the opponent has yet failed to express the object's essence.
5. Show that the definition is not correct.

There are two types of incorrect definitions: obscure (lack of clarity), and superfluous (longer than necessary).

First, Aristotle mentions some topics about obscure definitions. Is the definition ambiguous? Is the definition metaphorical? Is it a little bit of both, which is even more confusing? Is the definition of the contrary unclear? Is a single definition used to define more than one sense of an ambiguous term? If it applies to all of them, it is not true of any of them.

Then, he points out a topic for superfluous definitions. Does the definition still make clear the essence of the term and what makes it particular, after you remove a portion of it? If so, the definition is superfluous, you can cut out that part. For example, if man is defined as "rational animal", then adding "capable of receiving knowledge" will not add anything essential or distinguishing.

There are also topics about the differentia of a definition.

- Is the species or genus rendered as the differentia?
- Is the species or object predicated of the differentia?
- Is locality or present time rendered as the differentia?
- Is affectation rendered as the differentia? It shouldn't be, because the differentia shouldn't be what is changing, but rather, what is staying the same.

There are a number of topics for complex definitions, definitions that pertain to more than one element.

- When taking away the definition of one of the elements, does the rest of the definition of the complex term apply to the rest of the elements? If you define 'finite straight line', leaving out the definition of 'finite line' should leave you with the definition of straight.
- See if a definition made out of two distinct parts, A + B, can fail to apply when only one party is present. Justice could be defined as "temperance or courage", but in reality, if one person only has temperance, they are not just, because a just person would actually need both. This is similar to considering how a whole is not merely the sum of parts.

Some topics are about the products of two things.

- If the product of A + B is singular, but A is in one thing while B is in another, then the term defined is not a product of the two.
- If X > Y in the parts, then X should also be greater in the product of A + B.
- If X = Y (in degree), then the product of A + B should be neutral for X and Y.

But Aristotle also recognizes that neither follows. Like with drugs, two different drugs can be good, but when combined they are bad.

Aristotle provides one more topic about definition. If the thing defined possesses contraries equally likely to occur, the definition should not be through one of them. If the soul is equally capable of knowledge as it is of ignorance, then the soul should not be defined in terms of either. After all, this would mean that two definitions would apply to the object, even though the objective is a single unique definition.

== Book VII ==
Book VII restates the proper method of definition, discusses the topic of sameness again, and compares the various difficulties involved in forming arguments.

== Book VIII ==
The final book contains suggestions, hints, and some tricks about the techniques of organizing and delivering one or the other side of verbal argument.

Aristotle provides tips for constructing an argument.

1. select the grounds to make an attack
2. frame and arrange questions one by one to oneself
3. actually putting forth the questions to the other person

2 and 3 are unique for dialecticians. The arrangement should involve inductively securing premises, lending weight to argument, concealing conclusions, and making argument clear. Concealment is basically for making the conclusion not so obvious, which can make somebody more receptive because it is not immediately obvious where you are going.

There are additional topics for argument construction. You can't show first principles with the propositions shown through them, so first principles are understood through definition. Inferences closer to first principles are harder to argue with because fewer arguments can be used with regard to them. It might seem like this should be easier because fewer arguments are possible, but this also means there are fewer paths to show first principles compared to deeper and derivative ideas.

When inferences are drawn from premises more generally rejected than the conclusion, they should not be granted. Taking longer through many steps is faulty reasoning, because it conceals the grounds that the argument depends.

Aristotle makes clear that there are different rules for arguing for training or examination, compared to competition. Learners should state what they think, a questioning competitor should produce an effect on the other person, an answering competitor avoids being affected by the other person.

There are four ways to prevent someone from reaching a conclusion.

- demolish the point on which the falsehood depends
- stating an objection against the questioner
- stating an objection against the questions asked
- stating an objection when a point would take longer than the length of discussion for the actual issue

An argument is fallacious in four senses.

- when it only appears to be brought to a conclusion
- when it comes to a conclusion but not the proposed conclusion
- when it comes to the proposed conclusion but not according to the mode of inquiry (e.g., applying geometry to medicine)
- when it is reached through false premises

Aristotle ends with suggestions that you can use for yourself to practice and hone your skill. He mentions the importance of memory, and that you should have easily accessible ideas such as definitions, primary ideas, and familiar ideas. It is generally better to commit to memory premises that have general application, rather than specific pre-constructed arguments. Additionally, Aristotle advocates being a devil's advocate and to try arguing against yourself as practice.

== The Topics as related to Sophistical Refutations ==
The Sophistical Refutations is viewed by some as an appendix to the Topics, inasmuch as its final section appears to form an epilogue to both treatises.

== See also ==
- Argumentation scheme
- Predicables
