= Geoffroy Babion =

Roman Catholic archbishop (c. 1075–1158)

Geoffroy Babion, also known as Geoffroy du Loroux, was a French teacher, preacher and author who served as the archbishop of Bordeaux from 1136 to 1158.

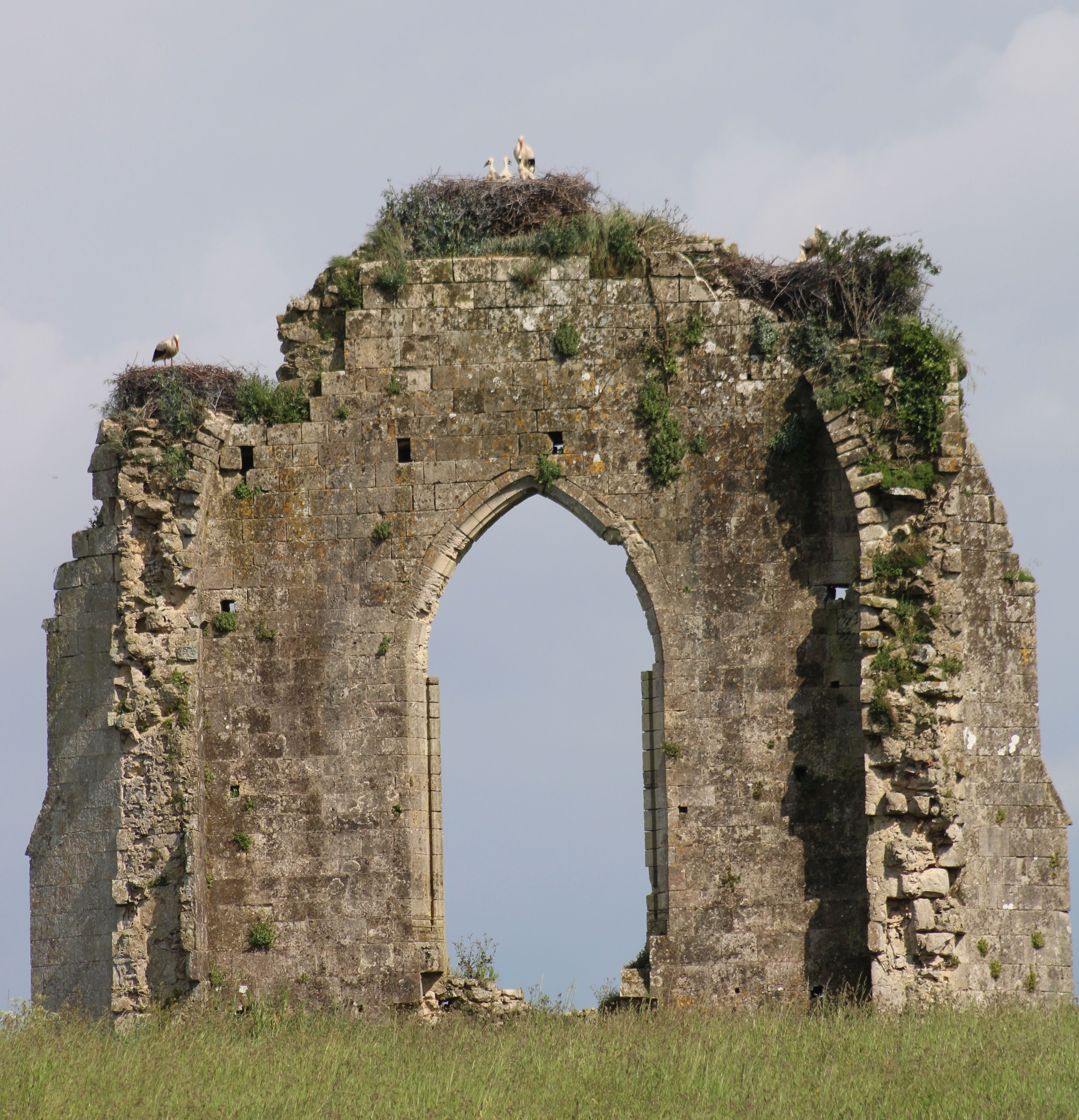
Ruins of Saint-Pierre de L'Isle

Babion was born around 1075. He was active as a preacher in the first quarter of the 12th century. He is attested as schoolmaster of Angers Cathedral in 1103–1106. He was succeeded by Ulger, the future bishop of Angers. In the decade after 1126, he founded several eremitic communities on the island of Saint-Pierre in the Gironde, at Sablonceaux and at Fontaine-le-Comte. In 1131, he was addressed in a letter by Bernard of Clairvaux. Calling him magister (master, teacher), Bernard encourages him to leave his "holy quietude" and join the fight against the Antipope Anacletus II.

A collection of Babion's sermons, known after its incipit as Dicite pusillanimes, is preserved in many manuscripts copied between the 12th and 15th centuries. Although renowned in his own time, Babion's reputation as a preacher was damaged by several modern historical errors. The Pseudo-Augustinian sermon Ad fratres in eremo was mistakenly attributed to him, turning him into a forger, and his sermons were mistakenly printed as part of the collection of works by Hildebert of Lavardin. Some scholars confused him with the later poet Peter Babion.

Babion became archbishop of Bordeaux between 8 and 29 August 1136. As bishop, he pursued reform along Gregorian lines. This led to conflict with the cathedral chapter, resulting in his exile from Bordeaux from 1140 until his triumphant return in 1145. In 1147–1149, while King Louis VII was away on the Second Crusade, he supported the regent, Abbot Suger of Saint-Denis, against the rebellious citizens of Bordeaux. From 1153 to 1158, he was an apostolic legate.

In Bordeaux, Babion favoured the Cistercians. They abbeys of La Grâce-Dieu (1136) and Notre-Dame de Bonlieu (1141) were founded during his time. In 1137, he presided at the founding of La Faise, which became Cistercian in 1147. He also favoured the canons regular. His own three eremitic foundations followed the Augustinian rule and sometime after 1145 he founded another at Pleine-Selve. Other monasteries that received his support include Fontevraud, La Couronne, Fontdouce, Orbestier, L'Absie and Nid-au-Merle.

Babion died on 18 July 1158, a date recorded in the necrologies of Fontevraud Abbey and Bordeaux Cathedral and in the epitaph composed by Robert of Torigni.

== Bibliography ==
- Bonnes, Jean Paul (1945). "Un des plus grands prédicateurs du XII^{e} siecle: Geoffroy du Loroux dit Geoffroy Babion". Revue Bénédictine. 56 (1–4): 174–215. doi:10.1484/j.rb.4.00161.
- Brutails, J.-A. (1922). "Geoffroi du Louroux, archevêque de Bordeaux de 1136 à 1158, et ses constructions". Bibliothèque de l'École des chartes. 83: 54–64.
- Foulon, Jean-Hervé (2017). "Geoffroy Babion, écolâtre d'Angers († 1158), l'exemple d'une collection de sermons". In Claude Carozzi; Huguette Taviani-Carozzi (eds.). Le médiéviste devant ses sources: Questions et méthodes. Presses universitaires de Provence. pp. 65–96.
- Masson, Juliette (2013). "Geoffroi du Loroux et l'architecture religieuse en Aquitaine au XII^{e} siècle". Bulletin du Centre d'études médiévales. 17 (1).
- Oury, Guy-Marie (1979). "Les sermons de Geoffroi Babion et la chrétienté bordelaise (1136–1158)". Cahiers de Civilisation Médiévale. 22 (87): 285–297.
