= Pseudo-Augustine =

Start of the Sermo de symbolo contra Iudaeos, paganos et Arianos in the early 14th-century manuscript B.II.20 of the Durham Cathedral Library

Pseudo-Augustine is the name given by scholars to the authors, collectively, of works falsely attributed to Augustine of Hippo. Augustine himself in his Retractiones lists many of his works, while his disciple Possidius tried to provide a complete list in his Indiculus. Despite this check, false attributions to Augustine abound.

== Examples ==
The Sermones ad fratres in eremo is a collection of pseudo-Augustinian sermons. It is by far the most prominent. It was printed along with Augustine's other sermons at Basel in 1494 by Johann Amerbach. Their authenticity was rejected by the Maurists in the 17th century. Once thought to be the work of Geoffroy Babion in the 12th century, it is now accepted that the Sermones were composed by an anonymous Belgian in the 14th century. They were forged with an apparent intention of strengthening the mendicant Order of Saint Augustine's historically dubious claims to have been established at Hippo by Augustine himself.

Among pseudo-Augustinian works on spirituality are the Manuale and Meditationes. Among the pseudonymous polemical works relating to the Pelagian and Arian conflicts are De fide ad Petrum (actually by Fulgentius of Ruspe), De unitate Trinitatis contra Felicianum (actually by Vergilius of Thapso), Altercatio cum Pascentio Ariano, Hypomnesticon contra Pelagianos et Caelestianos and De praedestinatione et gratia. On biblical exegesis there are Quaestiones Veteris et Novi Testamenti (probably by Ambrosiaster), Testimonia divinae scripturae et patrum, Liber de divinis scripturis sive Speculum and a commentary on the Book of Revelation actually by Caesarius of Arles. There are also spurious philosophical works traditionally and erroneously attributed to Augustine, such as the Categoriae decem ex Aristotele decerptae, a Latin paraphrase of the Categories of Aristotle. De igne purgatorio by Caesarius of Arles has at times been misattributed to Augustine. The 5th-century pseudo-Augustinian letter Gravi de pugna was often cited to justify war.

Other Pseudo-Augustinian works are:

- De ratione fidei
- De ordine creaturarum
- De cognitione verae vitae
- Sermo de symbolo contra Iudaeos, paganos et Arianos
- De quatuor virtutibus caritatis
- De vita christiana, possibly by Pelagius or Fastidius
- De quatuor virtutibus caritatis
- Sermo de penitentia animae
- Sermo de tempore barbarico
- De tribus habitaculis animae
- Sermo de humilitate et obedientia

== Usage ==
Pope Leo XIV quotes a Pseudo-Augustinian text alongside his references to Augustine's own works in his apostolic exhortation on love for the poor: "Almsgiving can be beneficial to you in erasing past sins, if you have amended your ways".
