= Organon =

Works by Aristotle on logic

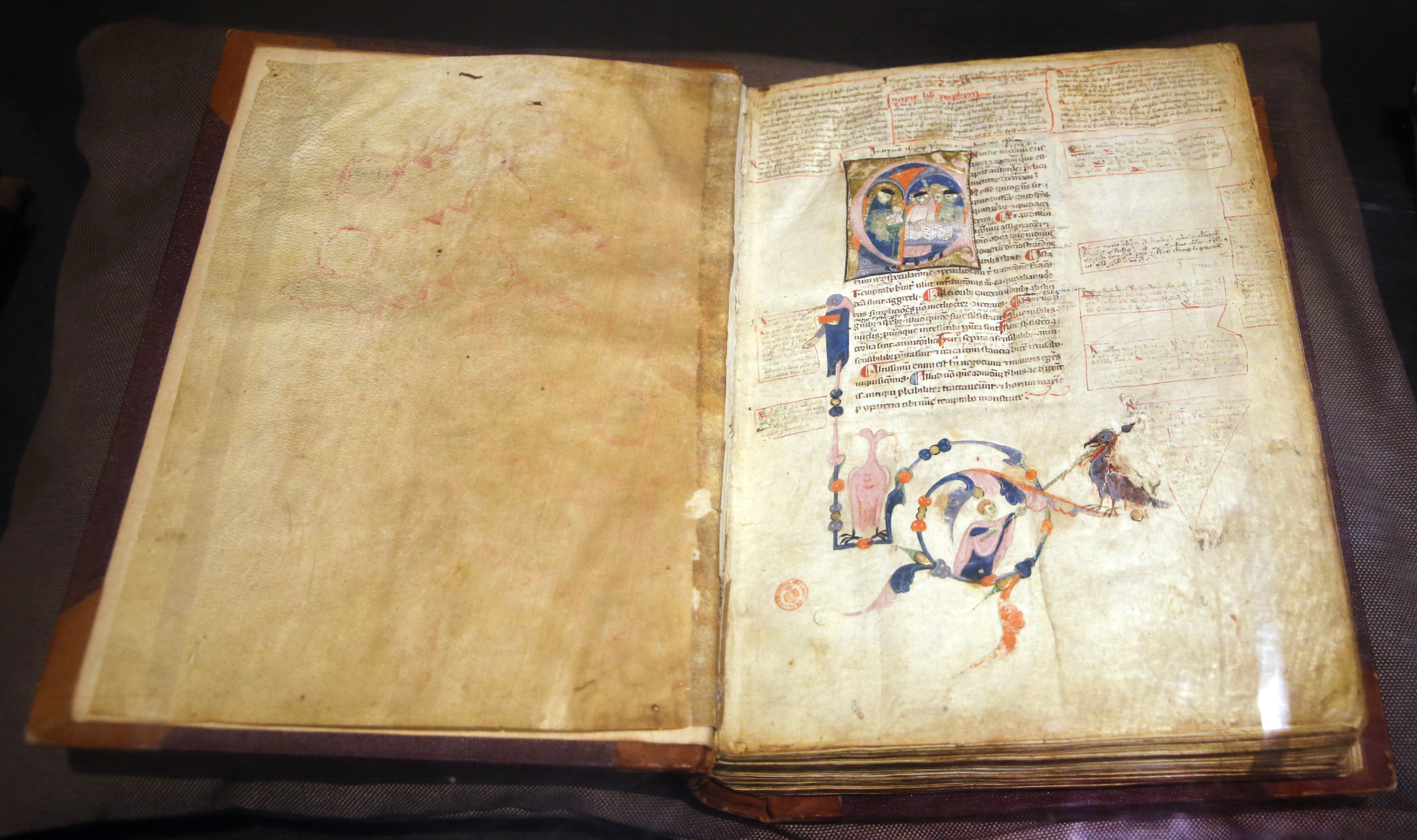
Organon

Roman copy in marble of a Greek bronze bust of Aristotle by Lysippos, c. 330 BC, with modern alabaster mantle

The Organon (Ancient Greek: Ὄργανον, meaning "instrument, tool, organ") is the standard collection of Aristotle's six works on logical analysis and dialectic.

The six works of Organon are as follows:

Bekker number	Work	Latin name
Logic
	Organon
1a	Categories	Categoriae
16a	On Interpretation	De Interpretatione
24a	Prior Analytics	Analytica Priora
71a	Posterior Analytics	Analytica Posteriora
100a	Topics	Topica
164a	On Sophistical Refutations	De Sophisticis Elenchis

== Constitution of the texts ==
The order of the works is not chronological (which is now hard to determine) but was deliberately chosen by Theophrastus to constitute a well-structured system. Indeed, parts of them seem to be a scheme of a lecture on logic. The arrangement of the works was made by Andronicus of Rhodes around 40 BC.

Aristotle's Metaphysics has some points of overlap with the works making up the Organon but is not traditionally considered part of it; additionally, there are works on logic attributed, with varying degrees of plausibility, to Aristotle that were not known to the Peripatetics.

1. The Categories (Latin: Categoriae) introduces Aristotle's 10-fold classification of that which exists: substance, quantity, quality, relation, place, time, situation, condition, action, and passion.
2. On Interpretation (Latin: De Interpretatione) introduces Aristotle's conception of proposition and judgement, and the various relations between affirmative, negative, universal, and particular propositions. Aristotle discusses the square of opposition or square of Apuleius in Chapter 7 and its appendix, Chapter 8. Chapter 9 deals with the problem of future contingents.
3. The Prior Analytics (Latin: Analytica Priora) introduces his syllogistic method (see term logic), argues for its correctness, and discusses inductive inference.
4. The Posterior Analytics (Latin: Analytica Posteriora) deals with definition, demonstration, inductive reasoning, and scientific knowledge.
5. The Topics (Latin: Topica) treats issues in constructing valid arguments in dialectic, and inference that is probable, rather than certain. It is in this treatise that Aristotle mentions the Predicables, later discussed by Porphyry and the scholastic logicians.
6. On Sophistical Refutations (Latin: De Sophisticis Elenchis) gives a treatment of logical fallacies, and provides a key link to Aristotle's tractate on rhetoric.

Whereas the Organon of the Latin Scholastic tradition comprises only the above six works, its independent reception in the Arabic medieval world saw appended to this list of works Aristotle's Rhetoric and Poetics.

== Influence ==
The Organon was used in the school founded by Aristotle at the Lyceum, and some parts of the works seem to be a scheme of a lecture on logic. So much so that after Aristotle's death, his publishers (Andronicus of Rhodes in 50 BC, for example) collected these works.

Following the collapse of the Western Roman Empire in the fifth century, much of Aristotle's work was lost in the Latin West. The Categories and On Interpretation are the only significant logical works that were available in the early Middle Ages. These had been translated into Latin by Boethius, along with Porphyry's Isagoge, which was also translated into Arabic by Ibn al-Muqaffa' via a Syriac intermediary. The other logical works were not available in Western Christendom until translated into Latin in the 12th century. However, the original Greek texts had been preserved in the Greek-speaking lands of the Roman Empire (i.e., Byzantium). In the mid-twelfth century, James of Venice translated into Latin the Posterior Analytics from Greek manuscripts found in Constantinople.

The books of Aristotle were available in the early Muslim world, and after 750 AD Muslims had most of them, including the Organon, translated into Arabic, normally via earlier Syriac translations. They were studied by Islamic and Jewish scholars, including Rabbi Moses Maimonides (1135–1204) and the Muslim judge Ibn Rushd, known in the West as Averroes (1126–1198); both were originally from Córdoba, Spain, although the former left Iberia and by 1168 lived in Egypt.

All the major scholastic philosophers wrote commentaries on the Organon. Aquinas, Ockham and Scotus wrote commentaries on On Interpretation. Ockham and Scotus wrote commentaries on the Categories and Sophistical Refutations. Grosseteste wrote an influential commentary on the Posterior Analytics.

In the Enlightenment there was a revival of interest in logic as the basis of rational enquiry, and a number of texts, most successfully the Port-Royal Logic, polished Aristotelian term logic for pedagogy. During this period, while the logic certainly was based on that of Aristotle, Aristotle's writings themselves were less often the basis of study. There was a tendency in this period to regard the logical systems of the day to be complete, which in turn no doubt stifled innovation in this area. However, Francis Bacon published his Novum Organum ("The New Organon") as a scathing attack in 1620. Immanuel Kant thought that there was nothing else to invent after the work of Aristotle, and the famous logic historian Karl von Prantl claimed that any logician who said anything new about logic was "confused, stupid or perverse." These examples illustrate the force of influence which Aristotle's works on logic had. Indeed, he had already become known by the Scholastics (medieval Christian scholars) as "The Philosopher", due to the influence he had upon medieval theology and philosophy. His influence continued into the Early Modern period and Organon was the basis of school philosophy even in the beginning of the 18th century. Since the logical innovations of the 19th century, particularly the formulation of modern predicate logic, Aristotelian logic had for a time fallen out of favor among many analytic philosophers.

However, the logic historian John Corcoran and others have shown that the works of George Boole and Gottlob Frege—which laid the groundwork for modern mathematical logic—each represent a continuation and extension to Aristotle's logic and in no way contradict or displace it. Boole fully accepted and endorsed Aristotle's logic, and Frege included Aristotle's square of opposition at the end of his groundbreaking Begriffsschrift to show the harmony of his theory with the Aristotelian tradition.

== See also ==
- Ignoratio elenchi
