= Category 3 =

Category 3 or Category III can refer to:

- Category 3 cable, a specification for data cabling
- British firework classification
- Category 3 tropical cyclone, on any of the tropical cyclone intensity scales
- Category 3 pandemic, on the pandemic severity index, an American influenza pandemic with a case-fatality ratio between 0.5% and 1%
- Category 3 winter storm, on the Northeast snowfall impact scale and the Regional snowfall index
  - Any of several winter storms listed at list of Northeast snowfall impact scale winter storms
- Category 03 non-silicate mineral - Halides
- Category III, a rating in the Hong Kong motion picture rating system
- Category III, a capability level of aircraft instrument landing systems
- Category III New Testament manuscripts - Eclectic
- Category III measurement - performed in the building installation
- Category III protected area (IUCN) - natural monument

== See also ==
- Class 3 (disambiguation) - class/category equivalence (for labeling)
- Type III (disambiguation) - type/category equivalence (for labeling)
- Group 3 (disambiguation) - group/category equivalence (for labeling)
