= Categorical =

Categorical may refer to:

- Categorical imperative, a concept in philosophy developed by Immanuel Kant
- Categorical theory, in mathematical logic
- Morley's categoricity theorem, a mathematical theorem in model theory
- Categorical data analysis
- Categorical distribution, a probability distribution
- Categorical logic, a branch of category theory within mathematics with notable connections to theoretical computer science
- Categorical syllogism, a kind of logical argument
- Categorical proposition, a part of deductive reasoning
- Categorization
- Categorical perception
- Category theory in mathematics
  - Categorical set theory
  - Categorical probability
- Recursive categorical syntax in linguistics

== See also ==
- Category (disambiguation)
