= Facts in Five =

Trivia game

- Designers: Rick Onanian
- Publishers: Advanced Ideas Co, 3M Company, Avalon Hill, Hasbro, University Games
- Publication: 1964
- Genres: Quiz
- Players: 1-5
- Playing time: 30 minutes
- Chance: Low
- Skills: General knowledge

Facts in Five: The Game of Knowledge is a trivia game for two or more players, designed in 1964 by Rick Onanian.

== Gameplay ==
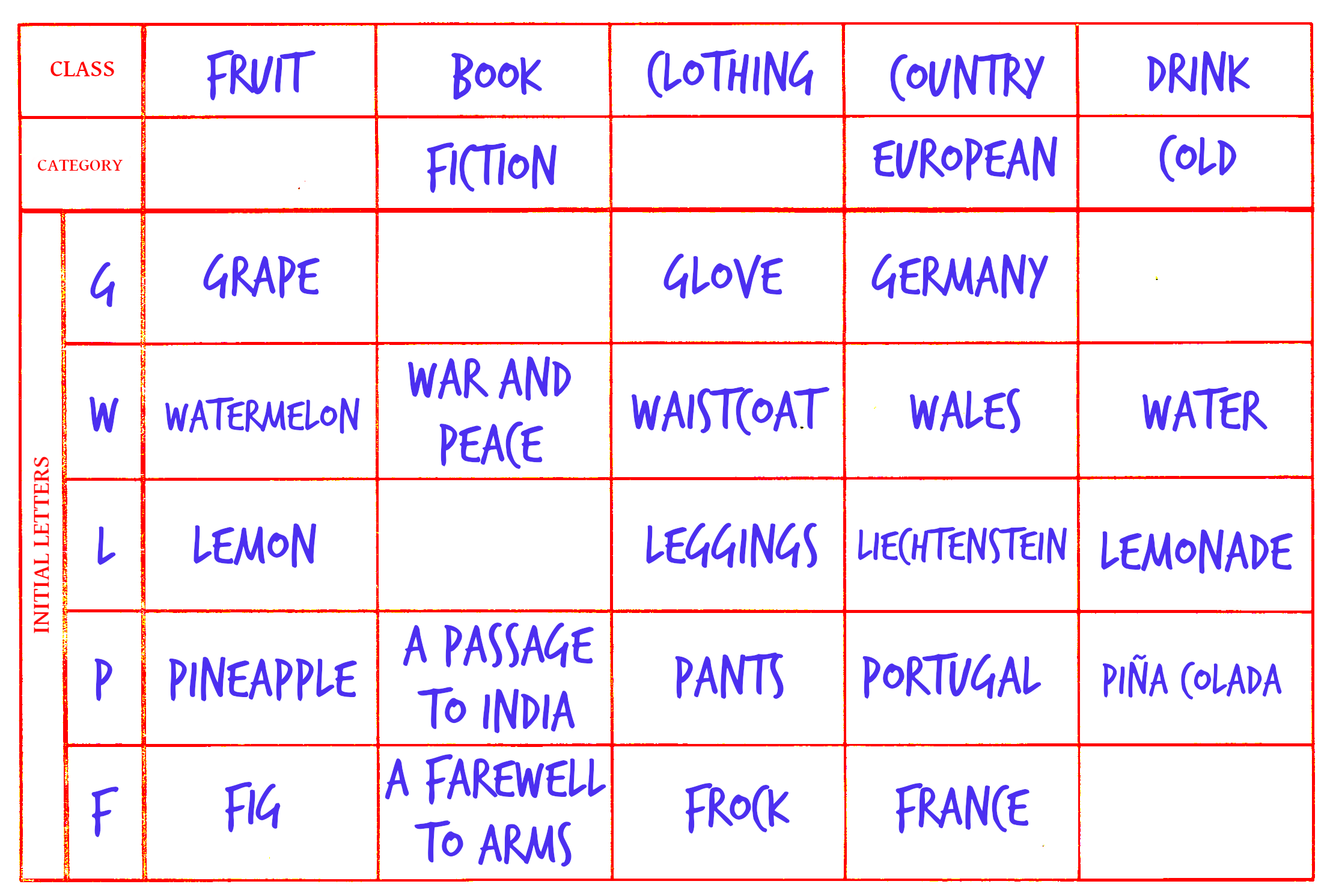
Example of an almost completed Facts in Five answer sheet

The game is based on the parlor game Categories.

Each game set includes a number of cards, each containing one or more Class (such as "Book titles"); within each Class may be one or more Category (such as "Fiction", "Non-fiction", "Romance", "Detective"). The game also includes tiles, one for each letter of the alphabet, a five-minute sand timer, and scorecards.

A round of the game begins with players taking turns drawing cards and selecting a Class from it (or optionally a more specific Category within that class). Five Categories are selected this way. Next, players draw five letter tiles in turn, and the timer is started.

Before the timer runs out, players must write down at most one entry for each category/beginning-letter pair (thus, a maximum of 25 answers). Five rounds make up a complete game, with scoring based on the number of valid answers given.

== Development and publication ==
Onanian got the idea for Facts in Five after reading in the newspaper supplement This Week that Categories was the favorite word game of the recently deceased President John F. Kennedy.

It was originally published in 1964 by Advanced Ideas Co of Arlington, Massachusetts. In 1967, Facts in Five was acquired by the 3M Company for its bookshelf game series. In 1976, 3M divested its game business to Avalon Hill of Baltimore, which published it until 1998, when it disbanded. Hasbro bought the rights to Avalon Hill's games, but stopped publishing Facts in Five; the rights reverted to the game's inventor, Rick Onanian. In 2007, a new edition was published by University Games.

Computer Facts in Five, a video game adaptation of Facts in Five, was published by Avalon Hill in 1982.

== Reception ==
Games magazine included Facts in Five in their "Top 100 Games" for 1980 and 1982, saying that "you can devise your own trivia games, but you won't come up with something as well put together as Facts In Five" and describing the changing combinations of categories and letters as an "endlessly absorbing" challenge.
