= Predicable =

In scholastic logic, predicable is a term applied to a classification of the possible relations in which a predicate may stand to its subject. It is not to be confused with 'praedicamenta', the scholastics' term for Aristotle's ten categories.

== Overview ==
The list given by the scholastics and generally adopted by modern logicians is based on development of the original fourfold classification given by Aristotle (Topics I.4, 101b17–25): definition (horos), genus (genos), property (idioma), and accident (symbebekos). The scholastic classification, obtained from Boethius's Latin version of Porphyry's Isagoge, modified Aristotle's by substituting species (eidos) and difference (diaphora) for definition. Both classifications are of universals, concepts or general terms, proper names of course being excluded. There is, however, a radical difference between the two systems. The standpoint of the Aristotelian classification is the predication of one universal concerning another. The Porphyrian, by introducing species, deals with the predication of universals concerning individuals (for species is necessarily predicated of the individual), and thus created difficulties from which the Aristotelian is free (see below).

The Aristotelian treatment considered:

- The definition of anything is the statement of its essence (Arist. τὸ τί ἦν εἶναι), i.e., that which makes it what it is: e.g., a triangle is a three-sided rectilinear figure.
- Genus is that part of the essence which is also predicable of other things different from them in kind. A triangle is a rectilinear figure; i.e., in fixing the genus of a thing, we subsume it under a higher universal, of which it is a species.
- A property is an attribute which is common to all the members of a class, but is not part of its essence (i.e., need not be given in its definition). The fact that the interior angles of all triangles are equal to two right angles is not part of the definition but is universally true.
- An accident is an attribute that may or may not belong to a subject. A triangle may have "accidentally" one right angle but this not a mandatory feature for it.
- Differentia is that part of the essence that distinguishes one species from another. As compared with quadrilaterals, hexagons, and so on, all of which are rectilinear figures, a triangle is differentiated as having three sides. Ignoring differences, species are seen as a genus, e.g. triangles are a species of polygons.

This classification, though it is of high value in the clearing up of our conceptions of the essential contrasted with the accidental, the relation of the genus, differentia and definition and so forth, is of more significance in connection with abstract sciences, especially mathematics, than for the physical sciences. It is superior on the whole to the Porphyrian scheme, which has grave defects. As has been said, the Porphyrian scheme classifies universals as predicates of individuals and thus involves the difficulties which gave rise to the controversy between realism and nominalism. How are we to distinguish species from the genus? Napoleon was a Frenchman, a man, an animal. In the second place, how do we distinguish property and accident? Many so-called accidents are predicable necessarily of any particular persons. This difficulty gave rise to the distinction of separable and inseparable accidents, which is one of considerable difficulty.

Some Aristotelian examples may be briefly mentioned. In the true statement “Man is a rational animal,” the predicate is convertible with the subject and states its essence; therefore, “rational animal” is the definition of a man. The statements “Man is an animal” and “Man is rational,” while true, are not convertible; their predicate terms, however, are parts of the definition and hence are the genus and differentia of man. On the other hand, the statement “Man is capable of learning grammar” is true and convertible; but “capable of learning grammar” does not state the essence of man and is, therefore, a property of man. The true statement “Man is featherless” offers an example of an accident. Its predicate is not convertible with its subject, nor is it part of the definition; accordingly, it expresses only an accidental characteristic of man.
