= Class 03 =

Class 03 may refer to:

- British Rail Class 03, a class of post-war, British diesel-mechanical shunter,
- DRG Class 03, a class of inter-war, German standard steam locomotive (Einheitslokomotive) for express train duties on lighter main lines.
- DRG Class 03.10, a streamlined, 3-cylinder development of the above DRG Class 03 built at the outset of World War II.

== See also ==
- Class 3 (disambiguation)
