= Dialectical research =

Form of qualitative research which utilizes the method of dialectic

Dialectical research or dialectical inquiry or dialectical investigation is a form of qualitative research which utilizes the method of dialectic, aiming to discover truth through examining and interrogating competing ideas, perspectives or arguments. Dialectical research can be seen as a form of exploratory research, in that there is not so much a research hypothesis to be tested, but rather new understandings to be developed.

Dialectical research may also be thought of as the opposite of empirical research, in that the researcher is working with arguments and ideas, rather than data. Indeed Bertell Ollman (1993) argues that all research is either dialectical or nondialectical. Dialectical research may be applied to a range of problems. For instance, Eli Berniker and David McNabb (2006) argue for the application of dialectical research for the study of organizational processes, and James Page (2008) has used a dialectical research method to develop a philosophy of peace education.
