= Scattergories =

Creative-thinking category-based party game

- Publishers: Hasbro; Winning Moves Games USA
- Players: 2–6
- Setup time: 1–3 minutes
- Playing time: a little over 3 minutes per round
- Chance: Low
- Age range: 12 and up
- Skills: Vocabulary; Counting; Social skills

Scattergories is a creative-thinking category-based party game originally published by Milton Bradley in 1988. The objective of the 2-to-6-player game is to score points by uniquely naming objects, people, actions, and so forth—all within a set of categories, given an initial letter, within a time limit. The game is based on a traditional game called Categories.

== Gameplay ==
The game is played in sets of 3 rounds. Each player takes a folder with an answering pad and three category cards. Each sheet in the answer pad has three columns of 12 blank lines. In addition, the category cards have four lists, each with 12 unique categories, for a total of 144 categories in the game. In new versions of the game, each card has two lists of 12 unique categories, for a total of 16 lists and 192 categories. All players must agree on the list to use.

A 20-sided letter die is rolled to determine the first letter used. The timer is set for up to three minutes.

In the time allotted, each player must attempt to write down one word or term for each of the 12 categories that starts with the rolled letter. Any number of words in the answer is allowed as long as the first word starts with the correct letter. Alliteration is encouraged with proper nouns in one game variation (e.g., Ronald Reagan is worth 2 points, and Hubert Horatio Humphrey is worth 3).

All players stop writing when the timer is finished and the answers are shared. Players score zero points for an answer that duplicates another answer in that round, and one point for an answer no other player has given. Acceptable answers that are proper nouns using alliteration score one point for each word using the letter. (In the "Junior" version, players earn two points for an answer that begins with the chosen letter, and one point for an answer that does not begin with the chosen letter, but no points for a duplicate answer.)

If a player thinks an answer does not fit the category, the player may challenge that answer. When challenged, all players vote on the validity of that answer. If the vote is a tie, the vote of the player who is being challenged is thrown out.

In the case of proper nouns, all parts of the answer will be counted as adequate provided one begins with the letter in play. For example, if the category is "U.S. presidents" and the round letter is "S", an acceptable answer would be "Harry S. Truman" because his middle initial is the letter S. Martin Sheen, however, was never a U.S. president and therefore is not a valid answer, rewarding zero points. (This rule does not apply to book titles.)

Broad interpretation is allowed for fun and creative gameplay. For example, in the case of things commonly found in the kitchen that start with the letter K, both knife (a kitchen tool) and kelp (a type of food that is commonly cooked in kitchens around the world) are acceptable answers.

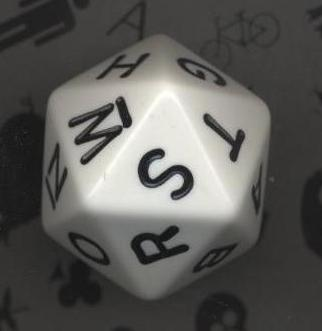
The Scattergories 20-sided die includes the letters A, B, C, D, E, F, G, H, I, J, K, L, M, N, O, P, R, S, T, and W and excludes the letters Q, U, V, X, Y, and Z.

== Later versions ==
In 1989, Milton Bradley published a "refill" pack for Scattergories. It consisted of 18 cards with 144 new categories and contained 6 new answer pads.

In 2008, Winning Moves Games USA published Scattergories The Card Game. It is a fast-playing, portable game of Scattergories. (It is not a booster pack.) The game includes a deck of letter cards, a deck of category cards and two "I Know" cards. To play, players turn over the top card in the letter deck and category deck and the first person to shout out a correct answer takes a card.

For example, an S card is turned over and "The Beach" is turned over. If a player slaps the "I Know" card and says "I know! Sand", that player claims either card and turns over a new letter or subject card (depending on what they claimed.) The game ends when one entire deck is exhausted. The player with the most cards wins.

In January 2010, Puzzlewright Press published Scattergories Word Search Puzzles by Mark Danna, a former associate editor at Games magazine. Sanctioned by Hasbro, this book provides Scattergories players with a way to play a solitaire version of the game with the following variations: write down two answers, not just one, for every category; instead of coming up with unique answers, try to match answers, which are hidden in a word search; score bonus points by matching answers hidden in the word search grid's leftover letters. There are no rounds. Players try to beat their most recent or their best score. Categories in the book are based on the ones in the board game but have modifications. There are 60 puzzle games in all.

In 2010, Winning Moves Games USA published Scattergories Categories, which is a twist on classic Scattergories play. Instead of finding answers that all start with one letter, Scattergories Categories focuses on one category per round and players race to find a unique answer starting with each letter in the category key word, which is related to the category in some way. As the game box shows, if the category word is "CAMPING TRIP" players have 2 minutes to find a word that starts with a C, then an A, then an M, and a P and so on. Players get 1 point for each unique answer and the first player to 25 points wins. The game contains 250 word challenges on 125 cards for players 12 and up.

In 2019, Winning Moves Games USA published Scattergories 30th Anniversary Edition. It is a classic reproduction of the original 1989 edition. It includes all original categories and components, including the mechanical timer with three different time settings, six folders, six answer pads, and the multisided, oversized die.

== Game show version ==
Scattergories became an NBC game show in 1993 hosted by Dick Clark. It ran right after Scrabble and featured Chuck Woolery as a regular panelist.

== Video game adaptations ==
Hasbro Interactive released Super Scattergories in 1999 for the PC. AllGame gave it a rating of three out of five, saying "it's fun to play but won't replace the paper version".

Scattergories was released to the iTunes App Store in 2015. The game was developed by Magmic and licensed through Hasbro.

== Reception ==
It was ranked the tenth best-selling toy in 1990 for the United States according to a survey by Playthings - thus being the only board game to be on Playthings' Top 10 list.
