= Class Struggle (board game) =

Board game about Marxism for 2–6 players

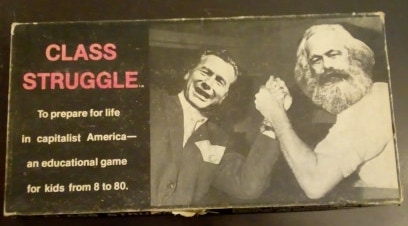
Class Struggle board game's box (front).

Class Struggle is a board game for two to six players, designed by Professor Bertell Ollman. It was published in 1978 by Avalon Hill. The game was intended to teach players about the politics of Marxism and was loosely compared to the board game Monopoly.

== Gameplay ==
The game pits Workers against Capitalists, represented by hammers and top hats respectively. Players receive their class by a roll of the "genetic" dice. Players move around a board following dice rolls and draw "Chance" cards which either advantage or disadvantage them.

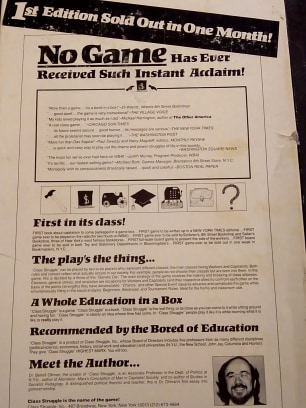
Class Struggle board game's box (back cover).

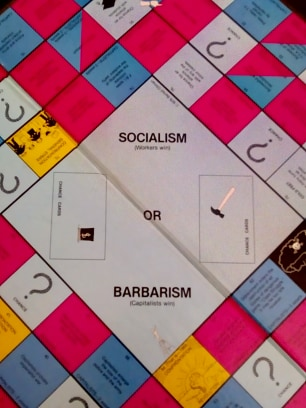
Class Struggle game's board.

== Publication history ==
In the year of its release, Bertell Ollman was interviewed about the game by print and TV news journalists. Critics of the game considered it to be "subversive" and lobbied some stores to remove the product from their shelves, largely unsuccessfully.

After attracting mainstream media attention during the Cold War, the game went on to sell approximately 230,000 copies. In 2014, Keith Plocek wrote that the objectives of the game were to "avoid nuclear war and win the revolution". Plocek claims that the game "disappeared" in 1994.

In 1983, Bertell published a book about the making of the game, bringing it to publication, and subsequent events, titled Class Struggle Is the Name of the Game: True Confessions of a Marxist Businessman.

== Reviews ==
- Jeux & Stratégie #23 (as "Lutte des Classes")
