= Computer Facts in Five =

1982 video game

- Publisher: Avalon Hill
- Engine: Advanced BASIC
- Platforms: Apple II, Atari 8-bit, MS-DOS
- Release: 1982
- Genre: Educational

Computer Facts in Five is an educational video game adaptation of the board game Facts in Five published by The Avalon Hill Game Company in 1982.

== Gameplay ==
In the game, each player in each round must supply five answers each to five separate classes of subject matter from popular topics to academic ones.

== Reception ==
Ed Curtis reviewed the game for Computer Gaming World, and stated that "When the desire comes upon you for a change from arcade games, or from fighting against some historic army or mythological beast, CFIF should definitely be considered. Played solitaire or as a party game (where its abilities shine best), this game, with the vast number of options combinations available, will continue to be enjoyable for years to come."

SoftSide reviewed the game in August 1983, comparing it to the gameshow Beat the Clock. PC Mag reviewed the game in its November 1983 issue. Electronic Games reviewed it in May 1984.
