= De Dialectica =

De Dialectica (Latin for "On Dialectics" or "On Logical Reasoning") may refer to:

- De Dialectica (Augustine), a 387 work by Augustine of Hippo
- De Dialectica (Alcuin), the third part of Alcuin's c. 790 Ars Grammatica
- De Dialectica (Cross), a 1672 work by John Cross (1630–1689)
- Praelectio de Dialectica, a 1491 work by Poliziano
- Summulae de Dialectica, a work by Jean Buridan

== See also ==
- Dialectics
- Dialectica
- De Inventione Dialectica, a 1479 work by Rodolphus Agricola
