= Class III =

Class III may refer to:

- Class III antiarrhythmic
- Class III β-tubulin
- Class III electrical appliance
- Class III gaming
- Class III NFA firearm
- Class III PI 3-kinase
- Class III railroad
- Luminosity class III (giant) star in the Yerkes or MK-system
- Pesticide Toxicity Class Class III
  - World Health Organization
  - United States Environmental Protection Agency
  - EU

== See also ==
- Class 3 (disambiguation)
