= Category 2 =

Category 2 or Category II may refer to:

- Category 2 cable, a grade of unshielded twisted pair cabling
- Category 2 tropical cyclone, on any of the Tropical cyclone intensity scales
- Category 2 pandemic, on the Pandemic severity index, an American influenza pandemic with a case-fatality ratio between 0.1% and 0.5%
- Category 2 winter storm, on the Northeast snowfall impact scale and the Regional snowfall index
  - Any of several winter storms listed at List of Northeast snowfall impact scale winter storms
- Category II New Testament manuscripts – Egyptian
- Category II measurement – performed on circuits directly connected to the low voltage installation
- Category-II Miniratna public sector undertakings (India)
- Category II protected area (IUCN) – National Park
- Category 02 non-silicate mineral – Sulfides, Sulfosalts, Sulfarsenates, Sulfantimonates, Selenides, Tellurides

== See also ==
- Class 2 (disambiguation) – class/category equivalence (for labeling)
- Type 2 (disambiguation) – type/category equivalence (for labeling)
- Group 2 (disambiguation) – group/category equivalence (for labeling)
