= Category 6 =

Category 6 or Category VI may refer to:

- Category 6: Day of Destruction, a 2004 made-for-TV movie
- Category 6 cable, a type of cable used for computer networking
- A proposed hurricane level above Category 5, on the Saffir-Simpson Hurricane Scale
- Category VI protected area (IUCN), with sustainable use of natural resources
- Category 6 (album), an album by DJ
