= Group 2 =

The term Group 2 may refer to:

- Alkaline earth metal, a chemical element classification
- Astronaut Group 2, also known as The New Nine, the second group of astronauts selected by NASA in 1962
- Group 2 (motorsport), an FIA classification for cars in auto racing and rallying that preceded Group A
- Group 2, the second level of worldwide Thoroughbred horse races
- Group 2 fax machine - Group 1 & Group 2 are obsolete analog standards for sending faxes
- Group of Two, a proposed informal special relationship between the United States and the People's Republic of China
