= Peter Babyon =

English poet and divine

Peter Babyon, or Babyo, or Babion, (fl. 1317 – 1366), was an English poet and divine in the reign of Edward II, He was educated from his earliest youth in the literae humaniores by masters of approved ability and long experience. He practised so diligently both prose and verse writing that he soon became an elegant poet and most adept rhetorician. When speaking of him as a poet, John Pits says that he was chiefly remarkable for talents which are rarely found in combination —

Ingenium felix, inventio, lucidus ordo, Gratia, majestas, ad rem bene congrua verba.

As his judgment became more matured by years, he was unwilling to spend all his life and all his ability in exercises of ordinary choice. He therefore betook himself to the reading of the holy scriptures, and in the midst of that labour he undertook the task of preaching the divine word, for which his previous education had so eminently qualified him. All the polite learning of his youth was now devoted to this sacred purpose. He achieved, as might be expected, a great success, and made for himself a name amongst theologians of no little fame. He was still living, according to Antonio Possevino, in 1366. His chief work was a 'Commentary on the Gospel of St. Matthew' in one book, which is bound up in the older editions of the works of St. Anselm. His other works are 'De officio Missæ Liber unus;' 'Sermonum Septuaginta liber unus;' 'Homiliarum Liber unus;' 'Comœdia carmine Liber unus;' 'Carminvim diversorum Liber unus.'
