= Category B =

Category B may refer to:

- Category B Listed building (Scotland)
- Category B Prison (UK)
- Category B Bioterrorism agent
- Category B services (Canadian television)
- A category of driving licence in the European Economic Area
- A category of driving licence in the United Kingdom
- An intermediate category of disease recognized by the US Centers for Disease Control and Prevention
- B movie
