= Category C =

Category C may refer to:

- Category C Listed building (Scotland)
- Category C Prison (UK)
- Category C Bioterrorism agent
- Pregnancy Category C
- Category C services (Canadian television)
- A category of driving licence in the European Economic Area
- A category of driving licence in the United Kingdom
- A hooligan (Germany)
- The least serious category of disease recognized by the US Centers for Disease Control and Prevention
