= Categories (game) =

Quiz game

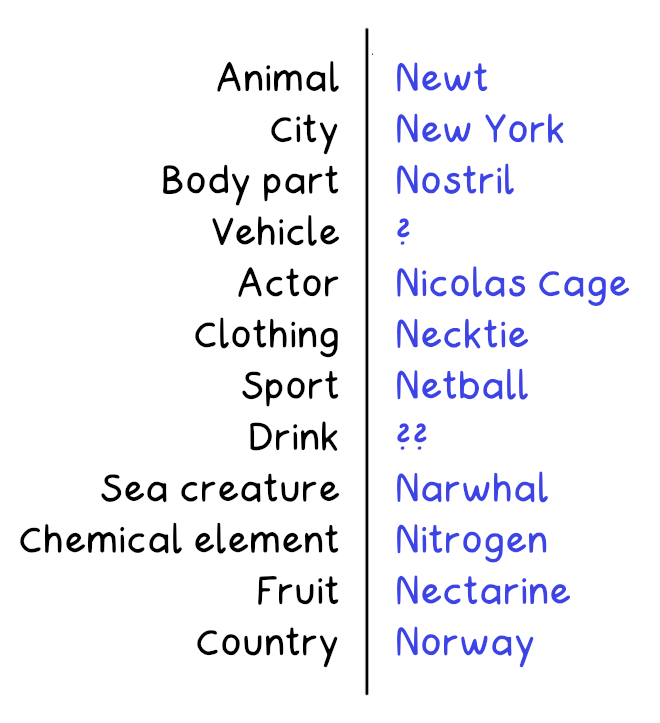
An example sheet from a game of Categories, for the letter "N"

Categories is a word game where players attempt to list words that fit into particular categories, all starting with the same letter. Players start by deciding on a list of categories between them, such as "town" or "actor", and each writing that list on a sheet of paper. A letter of the alphabet is then chosen at random, and players have a set amount of time to write something for each category that starts with that letter.

When the time is up, players swap sheets and score one another's attempts. An entry unique among the group is worth 2 points, whereas an entry shared with another player scores 1 point. The player with the highest total is the winner. For subsequent rounds, a different letter is chosen.

U.S. president John F. Kennedy is said to have been a fan of the game, one biography describing his family as playing it "endlessly".

== Guggenheim ==
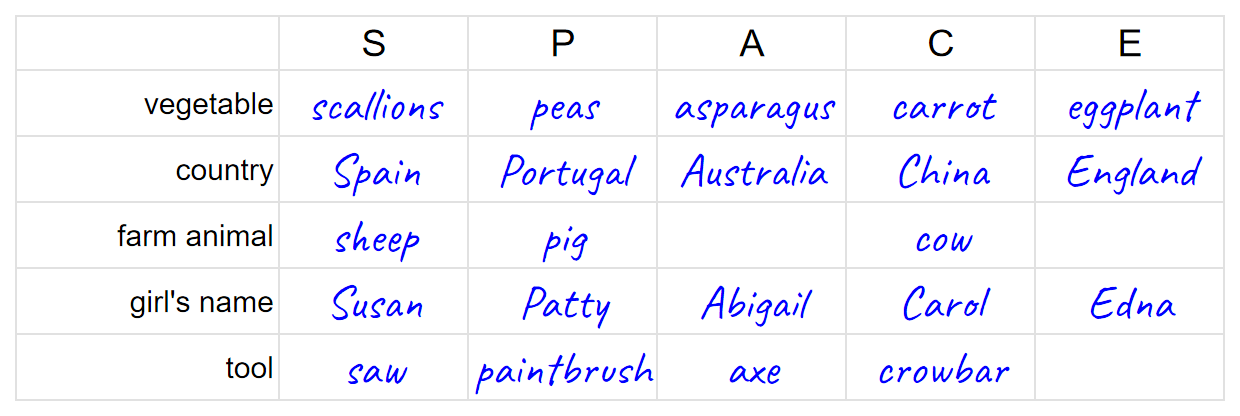
Partial answers in a grid for "Guggenheim"

In the variant known as "Guggenheim", players write a list of categories down one edge of the paper, and five columns across it, each column headed with a different letter so as to spell a five-letter word.

== Commercial versions ==
Game designer Richard Onanian's commercial game Facts in Five is based on a description of Kennedy playing Categories in a 1964 edition of This Week magazine.

The 1988 Parker Brothers game Scattergories is a reimplementation of Guggenheim, with a 20-sided die being used to generate random letters.
