= Bertell Ollman =

American academic

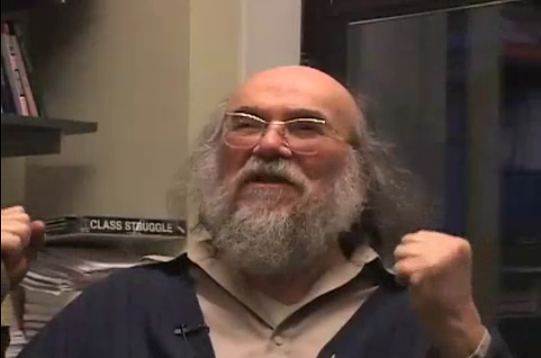
- Born: April 30, 1935 (age 91); Milwaukee, Wisconsin, US
- Education: University of Wisconsin, (BA); Oxford University (BA, MA, PhD)

Bertell Ollman (born April 30, 1935) is an American professor of politics at New York University. He teaches both dialectical methodology and socialist theory. He is the author of several academic works relating to Marxist theory.

Ollman attended the University of Wisconsin, receiving a BA in political science in 1956 and an MA in political science in 1957. He went on to study at Oxford University, earning a B.A. in Philosophy, Politics and Economics in 1959, an MA in political theory in 1963, and a D.Phil in political theory in 1967. He already had gained much teaching experience before receiving his PhD, and began teaching at NYU in 1967, immediately after earning his PhD.

== Class Struggle board game ==
Ollman is also the creator of Class Struggle, a board game based on Marxism, and from 1978 to 1983, he was president of Class Struggle, Inc., the company that initially produced and marketed the game. The game was later released by a major board game company, Avalon Hill. It received publicity for its political theme.

== Career ==
Ollman's early work Alienation has been called the definitive work on the topic, described by Peter Singer as "more readable than most works on alienation" and hailed as a brilliant and original study not only of Marx's concept of alienation but also of Marx's seemingly cavalier use of language, which, Ollman argued, cannot be adequately understood unless it is read as constantly relational.

In 1978, after having his offer of chairmanship of the Government Department at the University of Maryland College Park rescinded, Ollman sued columnists Robert Novak and Rowland Evans, alleging that a column they authored had libeled him, resulting in the rescinding of his offer. The column had characterized his teaching style as indoctrination, including an anonymous quote from another professor saying, "Ollman has no status within the profession, but is a pure and simple activist." Ollman's suit was defeated in the D.C. Circuit Court, which held that Novak and Evans's column was protected speech.

In 2001, he won the first Charles McCoy Life Achievement Award from the New Political Science section of the American Political Science Association.

In 2005, as a protest against Israel, Ollman wrote and published a Letter of Resignation from the Jewish People, stating: "Socialist and ex-Jew that I am, I guess I still have too much respect and love for the Jewish tradition I left behind to want the world to view it in the same way as they rightly view and condemn what the ex-Jews who call themselves Zionists are doing in its name. And if changing my status from ex-Jew (current) to non-Jew (projected) stirs even ten good people (God's minyan) into action against the Zionist hijacking of the Jewish label, then this is a sacrifice I am ready to make."

== Sean Hannity dispute ==
Ollman appeared on "Hannity & Colmes" to face the accusation that as Sean Hannity's professor in the 1980s, he had given Hannity a lower grade for being a politically conservative supporter of Ronald Reagan. Ollman pointed out that he had been a professor of Political Science at New York University for 40 years and claimed that if he had discriminated against conservative students, he "would not have lasted long." Ollman gave a detailed account of his teaching and an explanation of why his non-Marxist students "do at least as well as the rest of the class" in a 1978 letter to the editor of the Washington Post.

== Works ==
- Alienation: Marx's Conception of Man in Capitalist Society, Cambridge University Press, 1971; 2nd ed., 1976 (This book has gone through thirteen printings, sold close to 30,000 copies, and been translated into Spanish, Italian, and Korean)
- (co-ed.), Studies in Socialist Pedagogy, Monthly Review Press, 1978
- Social and Sexual Revolution: Essays on Marx and Reich, South End Press, 1978
- Class Struggle Is the Name of the Game: True Confessions of a Marxist Businessman, Wm. Morrow Pub., 1983; 2nd expanded ed. entitled Ball Buster? True Confessions of a Marxist Businessman, Soft Skull Press, 2003
- (co-ed.), The Left Academy: Marxist Scholarship on American Campuses, vol. I, McGraw Hill, 1982
- (co-ed.), The Left Academy (...), vol. II, Praeger Pub., 1984
- (co-ed.), The Left Academy (...), vol. III, Praeger Pub., 1986
- (co-ed.), The U.S. Constitution: 200 Years of Anti-Federalist, Abolitionist, Feminist, Muckraker, Progressive, and Especially Socialist Criticism, New York Uiniversity Press, 1990
- Marxism: an Uncommon Introduction, New Delhi: Stirling Pub., 1991
- Dialectical Investigations, Routledge, 1993 (A French translation is forthcoming)
- (ed. and co-author), Market Socialism: the Debate Among Socialists, Routledge, 1998 (A Chinese translation appeared in 2000)
- (co-ed.)Dialectics: the New Frontier, Special Issue of "Science and Society", Fall 1998 (An expanded version of this issue will soon be published as a book)
- How to Take an Exam...and Remake the World, Montreal: Black Rose Books, Spring 2001
- BALL BUSTER? True Confessions of a Marxist Businessman, Soft Skull Press, 2002
- Dance of the Dialectic: Steps in Marx's Method, University of Illinois Press, 2003 (Turkish translation has been completed in February 2007 and a Chinese translation is being prepared)
