= Category A =

Category A may refer to:

- Category A Listed building (Scotland)
- Category A Prison (UK)
- Category A Bioterrorism agent
- Category A services (Canada)
- A category of driving licence in the European Economic Area
- A category of driving licence in the United Kingdom
- The most serious category of disease recognized by the US Centers for Disease Control and Prevention
