= Dialectica =

Philosophy journal

- Discipline: Philosophy
- Language: English

Publication details
- History: 1947–2024
- Publisher: Blackwell-Wiley (2004–2019); Philosophie.ch (2020–2024)
- Frequency: Quarterly
- Open access: Yes

Standard abbreviations
- ISO 4: Dialectica

Dialectica is a quarterly philosophy journal established in 1947 by Gaston Bachelard, Paul Bernays, and Ferdinand Gonseth.

It was published by Blackwell between 2004 and 2019, then between 2020 and 2024 it was published by Philosophie.ch in full open access. It focuses on analytic philosophy and is the official journal of the European Society for Analytic Philosophy.

The journal is considered among the most respected general journals in the discipline.

== See also ==
- De Dialectica
- Dialectica interpretation
