= Christopher J. Arthur =

British philosopher

Christopher John Arthur (since 1990 aka. Chris Arthur, Christopher Arthur or C. J. Arthur) (born February 7, 1940) is a philosopher and author of Marxist Dialectic.

== Life ==
Christopher J. Arthur studied at the University of Nottingham and University of Oxford. He taught philosophy at the University of Sussex for 25 years. He is a member of the International Symposium on Marxian Theory, which has been organizing annual symposia since 1991 and has already published 10 anthologies.

Arthur is a proven expert on the works of Karl Marx. He advocates the so-called "Homology Thesis," according to which the dialectical methods of Marx and Georg Wilhelm Friedrich Hegel are similar in form but exist on different ontological levels. The real movement of exchange, as described by Marx in Das Kapital, thus models the self-moving thought forms from Hegel's idealistic theory.

Arthur can be considered the main representative of the so-called New Dialectics, which can also be regarded as a school of its own. This is characterized by its distinction from analytical Marxism, which rejects dialectics, and Hegelian-Marxist approaches, which focus on Hegel's philosophy of history.

== Works ==
=== Books ===
- Dialectics of Labour: Marx and his Relation to Hegel, Blackwell 1986
- The New Dialectic and Marx's Capital, Brill, Leiden Boston Köln 2002^{1}, Taschenbuch 2004, ISBN 978-90-04-13643-4 (Historical Materialism Book Series, 1)
- The Spectre of Capital: Idea and Reality, Brill Leiden Bosten 2022, ISBN 978-90-04-51517-8 (Historical Materialism Book Series, 257).

=== Edited volumes and Introductions ===
- Karl Marx und Friedrich Engels, The German Ideology, englische Ausgabe von Die deutsche Ideologie (1845), Lawrence & Wishart, London 1970^{1}, revidierte Ausgabe 1974
- Jewgeni Bronislawowitsch Paschukanis: Law and Marxism London 1978^{1}, 3. Aufl. Pluto Press, London 1989
- Marx's Capital. A Student's Edition gekürzte Ausgabe von Das Kapital, Lawrence & Wishart, London 1992
- Engels Today: A Centenary Appreciation, Macmillan Press, Basingstoke und St. Martin's Press, New York 1996
- mit Geert Reuten: The Circulation of Capital: Essays on Volume Two of Marx's 'Capital' Macmillan Press, Basingstoke und St. Martin's Press, New York 1998
