= Class 3 =

Class 3 may refer to:

- BR Standard Class 3 2-6-0, British steam locomotive
- BR Standard Class 3 2-6-2T, British steam locomotive
- Classes of United States senators
- L&YR Class 3, British 4-4-0 steam locomotive
- SCORE Class 3, off-road racing trucks
- The third class in terms of hiking difficulty in the Yosemite Decimal System
- A class in US truck classification
- Class 3, in the electrical Appliance classes
- A contribution class in the National Insurance system in the UK

== See also ==
- Class III (disambiguation)
- Class 03 (disambiguation)
- NSB El 3, Norwegian electric locomotive
- NSB Di 3, Norwegian diesel locomotive
- Type 3 (disambiguation)
