= Categoriae decem =

Latin summary of the Categories of Aristotle

The Categoriae decem (Latin for "The Ten Categories"), also known as the Paraphrasis Themistiana ("Themistian Paraphrase"), is a Latin summary of Aristotle's Categories thought to date to the 4th century AD. Traditionally credited to St Augustine, it is now variously attributed to Themistius or Pseudo-Augustinus.

From the eighth century onwards, this text became one of the major sources of logical teaching in medieval Europe, where it was taken at times as a full translation of Aristotle's work, rather than a compression. Its importance rests in the revival of the study of logic it stimulated in the early medieval West, beginning, it would seem, at the court of Charlemagne. Those influenced included Alcuin, particularly in his De Dialectica, Fridugisus and Johannes Scotus Eriugena.

From around the 10th century, the Categoriae decem was increasingly replaced by Boethius's translations and commentaries on Aristotle's logic before being replaced by new translations from Arabic and Greek copies of the work during the 12th-century renaissance.

== See also ==
- Commentaries on Aristotle
