= Type III =

Type III or Type 3 may refer to:

== Japanese weapons ==
- Type 3 Chi-Nu, a Japanese medium tank
- Type 3 mine, a Japanese land mine
- 8 cm/40 3rd Year Type naval gun, a Japanese weapon
- Type 3 12 cm AA Gun, a Japanese weapon
- Type 3 Chū-SAM, a Japanese medium-range surface-to-air missile
- Type 3 heavy machine gun, a Japanese heavy machine gun of World War I
- Type 3 aircraft machine gun, a Japanese aircraft machine gun of World War II

== Biology and medicine ==
- Hyperlipoproteinemia type III, a risk factor for cardiovascular disease
- Nitric oxide synthase 3, an enzyme
- Type III intermediate filaments, structural proteins
- Type III secretion system used by pathogenic bacteria
- Type III diabetes, alternative naming of Alzheimer's disease

== Mathematics ==
- Type III von Neumann algebra
- Type III sums of squares, a measurement of the explanatory power of a variable after accounting for all other variables in the model in statistics
- Type III error, any of several proposed extensions to the concept of Type I and type II errors in statistics

== Other ==
- Type-III Civilization on the Kardashev scale, a way to classify civilizations
- British Railways Type 3 Diesel locomotives
- The Volkswagen Type 3
- Peugeot Type 3
- The IBM Type-III Library, a distribution mechanism for unsupported IBM mainframe software such as CP/CMS
- PostScript fonts Type 3, a format of Postscript fonts
- Motorola Type IIi Hybrid, a trunked radio system
- IEC 62196 Type 3 connector type (alias Plug Alliance)
- R-Type III: The Third Lightning, a video game
- IEC Type III, one of the four "type" classifications of audio cassette formulation
- Type-3 language in the Chomsky hierarchy of formal languages, a.k.a. regular language
- The Type III denim jacket
- Cooper 500, aka Cooper T3, a single seater racing car

== See also ==
- Class 3 (disambiguation)
