= Categorical set theory =

Sets defined using mathematical category theory

Categorical set theory is any one of several versions of set theory developed from or treated in the context of mathematical category theory. Its basis originated with the development of ETCS by William Lawvere in 1964.

== See also ==
- Categorical logic
