= Differentia =

In scholastic logic, differentia (also called differentia specifica) is one of the predicables; it is that part of a definition which is predicable in a given genus only of the definiendum; or the corresponding "metaphysical part" of the object. In the original, logical sense, a differentia is a concept – the notion of "differentia" is a second-order concept, or a "second intention", in the scholastic nomenclature. In the scholastic theory, it is a kind of essential predicate – a predicate that belongs to its subjects de re necessarily. It is distinguished against the species by expressing the (specific) essence of the object only partially and against the genus by expressing the determining rather than the determined part of the essence.

== History ==
In Ancient Greek philosophy, Plato implicitly employed the concept of differentia when he conceived his method of diairesis. Aristotle was the first to use the term diaphora (διαφορά) in a systematic fashion; but he had no explicit theory about it, and his understanding of the term is controversial. Adiaphora – the negation of diaphora – is an important term in Hellenistic philosophy. However, only in Pyrrhonism does it appear to be a denial of Aristotle's notion of diaphora. A theory was only provided by Porphyry's explicit treatment of the predicables presented in his Isagoge. The elaborate scholastic theory of the predicables evolved οn the basis of Boethius' translation of the Isagoge, where the Greek term diaphora was rendered in Latin as "differentia".

Although the primary meaning of "differentia" is logical or second-order, it may under certain assumptions have an ontological, first-order application. If it is assumed that the structuring of an essence into "determining" and "determinable" metaphysical parts (which corresponding to a differentia and a genus respectively) exists in reality independently of its being conceived, one can apply the notion "differentia" also to the determining metaphysical part itself, and not just to the concept that expresses it. This is common in Scotism, where the metaphysical parts are said to be formally distinct. If, on the other hand, any mind-independent structuring on the part of the essence is denied (like in Thomism or Suárezianism), then the partitioning of the essence into a generic and a differentiating part must be considered as merely "conceptua", whereas the actual realities corresponding to the differentia and to the genus evade as really the same. These assumptions therefore do not permit any ontological application of the notion of differentia.

== See also ==
- Genus (philosophy)
- Predicable
