= Genus–differentia definition =

Type of intensional definition

A genus–differentia definition is a type of intensional definition, and it is composed of two parts:

1. a genus (or family): An existing definition that serves as a portion of the new definition; all definitions with the same genus are considered members of that genus.
2. the differentia: The portion of the definition that is not provided by the genus.

For example, consider these two definitions:

- a triangle: A plane figure that has 3 straight bounding sides.
- a quadrilateral: A plane figure that has 4 straight bounding sides.

Those definitions can be expressed as one genus and two differentiae:

1. one genus:
  - the genus for both a triangle and a quadrilateral: "A plane figure"
2. two differentiae:
  - the differentia for a triangle: "that has 3 straight bounding sides."
  - the differentia for a quadrilateral: "that has 4 straight bounding sides."

The use of a genus (Greek: genos) and a differentia (Greek: diaphora) in constructing a definition goes back at least as far as Aristotle (384–322 BCE). Furthermore, a genus may fulfill certain characteristics (described below) that qualify it to be referred to as a species, a term derived from the Greek word eidos, which means "form" in Plato's dialogues but should be taken to mean "species" in Aristotle's corpus.

== Differentiation and abstraction ==
The process of producing new definitions by extending existing definitions is commonly known as differentiation (and also as derivation). The reverse process, by which just part of an existing definition is used itself as a new definition, is called abstraction; the new definition is called an abstraction and it is said to have been abstracted away from the existing definition.

For instance, consider the following:

- a square: a quadrilateral that has interior angles which are all right angles, and that has bounding sides which all have the same length.

A part of that definition may be singled out (using parentheses here):

- a square: (a quadrilateral that has interior angles which are all right angles), and that has bounding sides which all have the same length.

and with that part, an abstraction may be formed:

- a rectangle: a quadrilateral that has interior angles which are all right angles.

Then, the definition of a square may be recast with that abstraction as its genus:

- a square: a rectangle that has bounding sides which all have the same length.

Similarly, the definition of a square may be rearranged and another portion singled out:

- a square: (a quadrilateral that has bounding sides which all have the same length), and that has interior angles which are all right angles.

leading to the following abstraction:

- a rhombus: a quadrilateral that has bounding sides which all have the same length.

Then, the definition of a square may be recast with that abstraction as its genus:

- a square: a rhombus that has interior angles which are all right angles.

In fact, the definition of a square may be recast in terms of both of the abstractions, where one acts as the genus and the other acts as the differentia:

- a square: a rectangle that is a rhombus.
- a square: a rhombus that is a rectangle.

Hence, abstraction is a means of simplifying definitions.

== Multiplicity ==
When multiple definitions could serve equally well, then all such definitions apply simultaneously. Thus, a square is a member of both the genus [a] rectangle and the genus [a] rhombus. In such a case, it is notationally convenient to consolidate the definitions into one definition that is expressed with multiple genera (and possibly no differentia, as in the following):

- a square: a rectangle and a rhombus.

or completely equivalently:

- a square: a rhombus and a rectangle.

More generally, a collection of $n>1$ equivalent definitions (each of which is expressed with one unique genus) can be recast as one definition that is expressed with $n$ genera. Thus, the following:

- a Definition: a Genus_{1} that is a Genus_{2} and that is a Genus_{3} and that is a... and that is a Genus_{n-1} and that is a Genus_{n}, which has some non-genus Differentia.
- a Definition: a Genus_{2} that is a Genus_{1} and that is a Genus_{3} and that is a... and that is a Genus_{n-1} and that is a Genus_{n}, which has some non-genus Differentia.
- a Definition: a Genus_{3} that is a Genus_{1} and that is a Genus_{2} and that is a... and that is a Genus_{n-1} and that is a Genus_{n}, which has some non-genus Differentia.
- ...
- a Definition: a Genus_{n-1} that is a Genus_{1} and that is a Genus_{2} and that is a Genus_{3} and that is a... and that is a Genus_{n}, which has some non-genus Differentia.
- a Definition: a Genus_{n} that is a Genus_{1} and that is a Genus_{2} and that is a Genus_{3} and that is a... and that is a Genus_{n-1}, which has some non-genus Differentia.

could be recast as:

- a Definition: a Genus_{1} and a Genus_{2} and a Genus_{3} and a... and a Genus_{n-1} and a Genus_{n}, which has some non-genus Differentia.

== Structure ==
A genus of a definition provides a means by which to specify an is-a relationship:

- A square is a rectangle, which is a quadrilateral, which is a plane figure, which is a...
- A square is a rhombus, which is a quadrilateral, which is a plane figure, which is a...
- A square is a quadrilateral, which is a plane figure, which is a...
- A square is a plane figure, which is a...
- A square is a...

The non-genus portion of the differentia of a definition provides a means by which to specify a has-a relationship:

- A square has an interior angle that is a right angle.
- A square has a straight bounding side.
- A square has a...

When a system of definitions is constructed with genera and differentiae, the definitions can be thought of as nodes forming a hierarchy or—more generally—a directed acyclic graph; a node that has no predecessor is a most general definition; each node along a directed path is more differentiated (or more derived) than any one of its predecessors, and a node with no successor is a most differentiated (or a most derived) definition.

When a definition, S, is the tail of each of its successors (that is, S has at least one successor and each direct successor of S is a most differentiated definition), then S is often called the species of each of its successors, and each direct successor of S is often called an individual (or an entity) of the species S; that is, the genus of an individual is synonymously called the species of that individual. Furthermore, the differentia of an individual is synonymously called the identity of that individual. For instance, consider the following definition:

- [the] John Smith: a human that has the name 'John Smith'.

In this case:

- The whole definition is an individual; that is, [the] John Smith is an individual.
- The genus of [the] John Smith (which is "a human") may be called synonymously the species of [the] John Smith; that is, [the] John Smith is an individual of the species [a] human.
- The differentia of [the] John Smith (which is "that has the name 'John Smith'") may be called synonymously the identity of [the] John Smith; that is, [the] John Smith is identified among other individuals of the same species by the fact that [the] John Smith is the one "that has the name 'John Smith'".

As in that example, the identity itself (or some part of it) is often used to refer to the entire individual, a phenomenon that is known in linguistics as a pars pro toto synecdoche.

== See also ==
- Binomial nomenclature
- Hyponymy and hypernymy
