= Graduation =

Bestowing of a diploma or academic degree

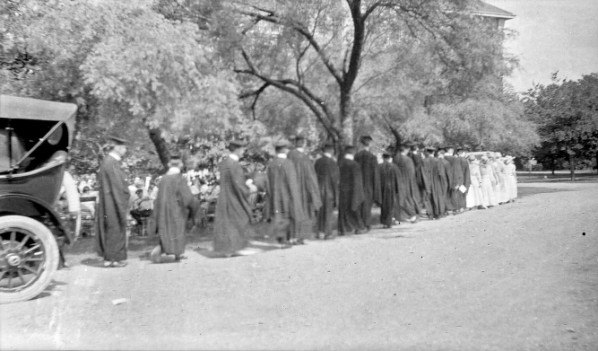
Students lined up at a graduation ceremony in the United States in the early 20th century

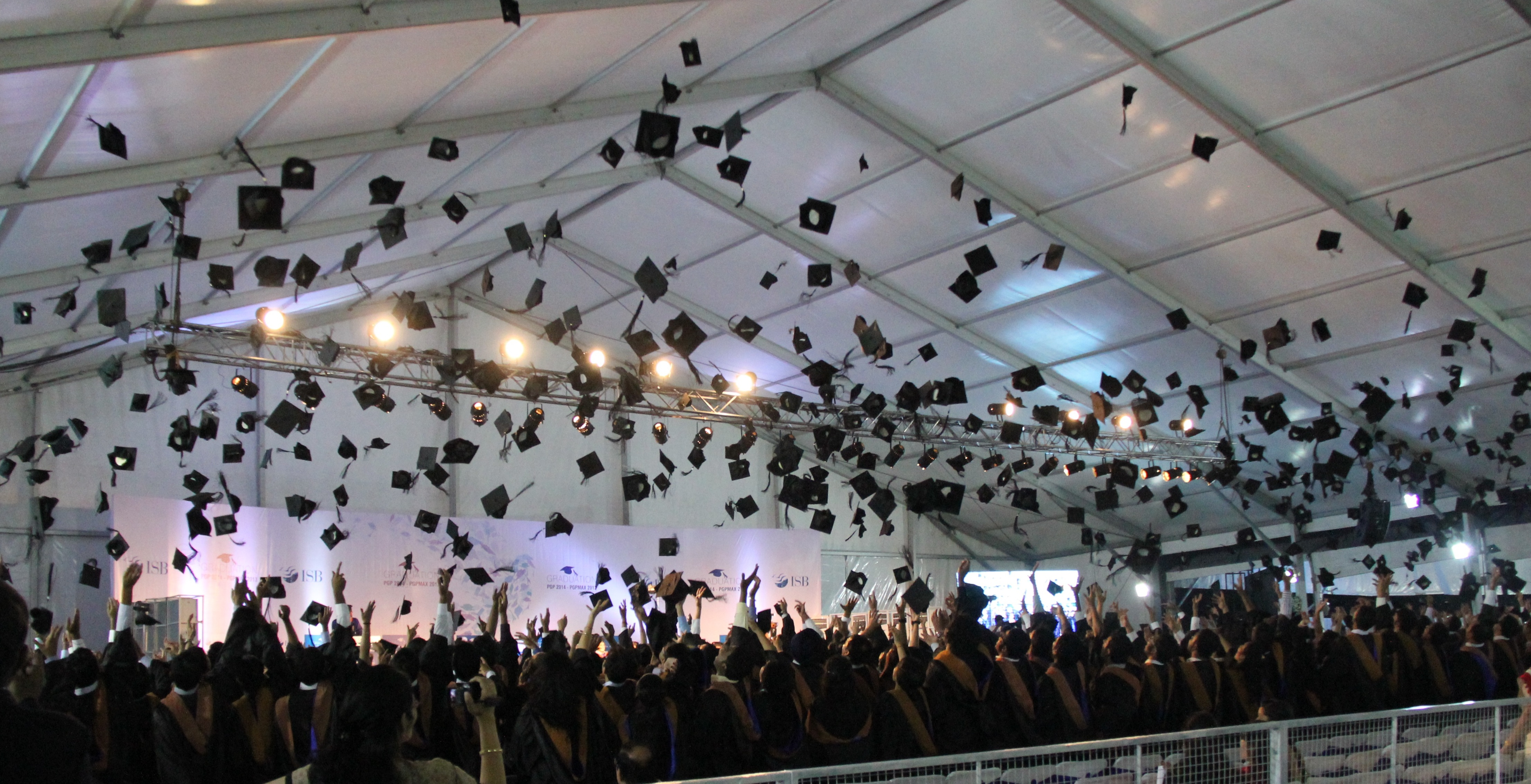
Graduation hats being tossed by fresh graduates of ISB (Hyderabad, India)

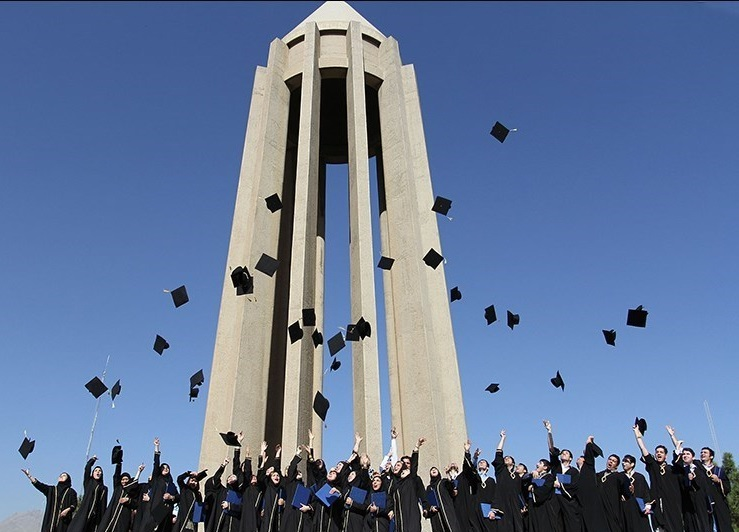
Medical student graduation in Avicenna Mausoleum, Hamedan, Iran

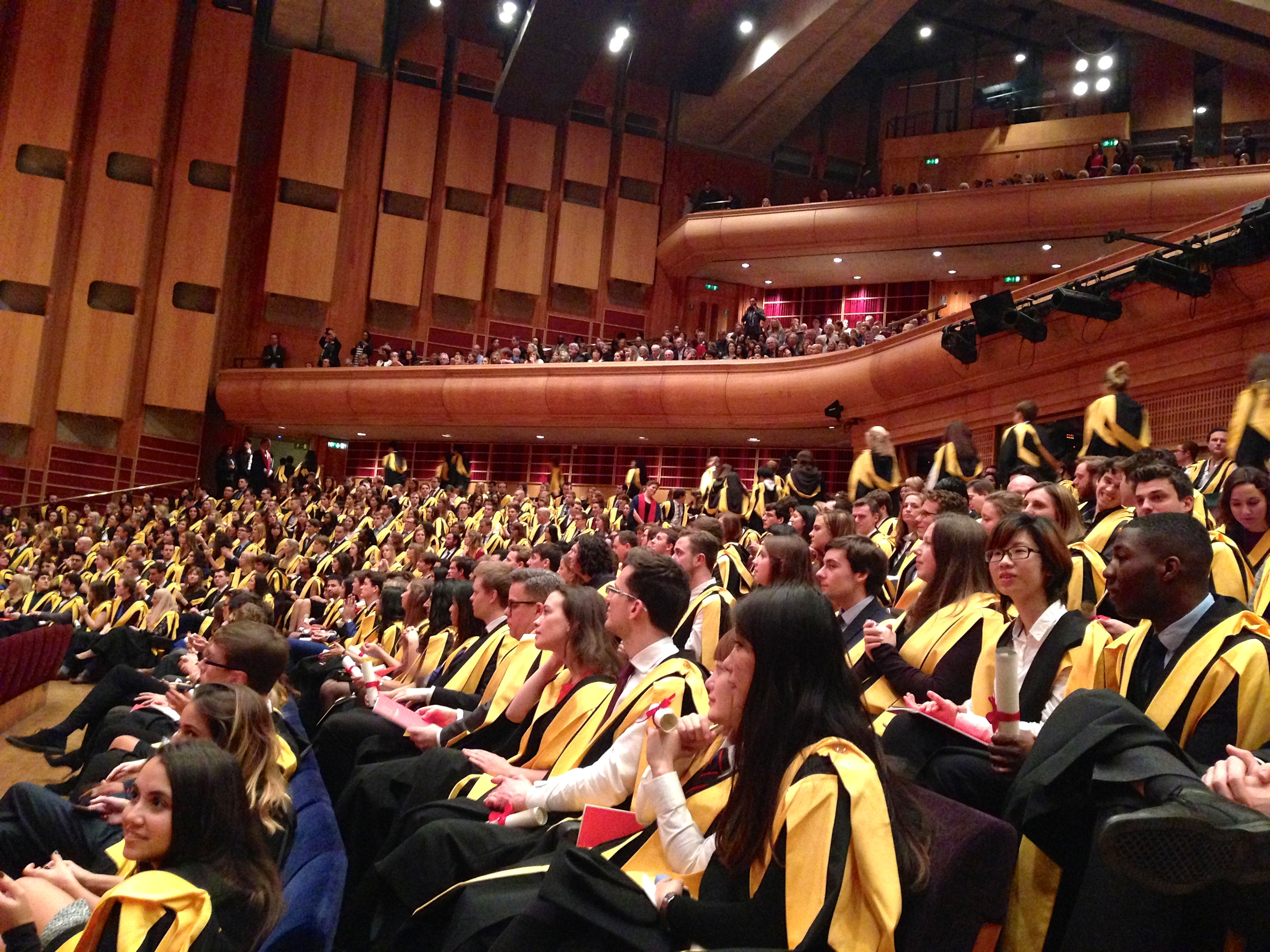
King's College London graduands wearing academic dress without caps

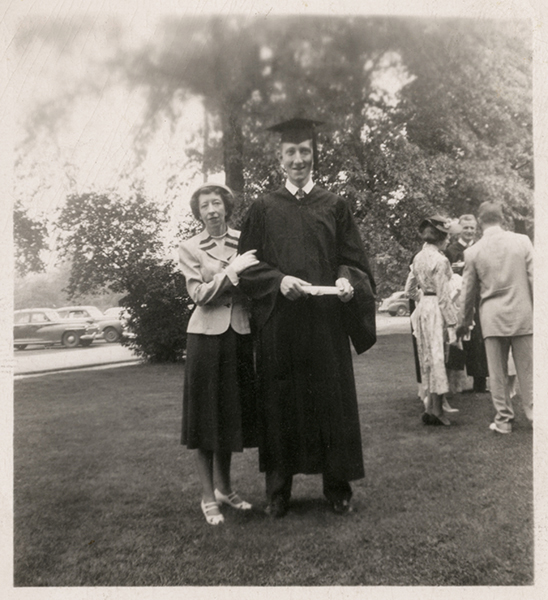
Susquehanna University Graduation, 1951

A graduation is the awarding of a diploma by an educational institution. It may also refer to the ceremony that is associated with it, which can also be called commencement, congregation, convocation or invocation. The date of the graduation ceremony is often called graduation day. Graduates can be referred to by their year of graduation.

== History ==
Ceremonies for graduating students date from the first universities in Europe in the twelfth century. At that time, Latin was the language of scholars. A universitas was a guild of masters (such as MAs) with license to teach. The etymology of "degree" and "graduate" originates from gradus, meaning "step". The first step was admission to a bachelor's degree. The second step was the master's step, giving the graduate admission to the universitas and license to teach. Typical dress for graduation is a gown and hood, or hats adapted from the daily dress of university staff in the Middle Ages, which was in turn based on the attire worn by medieval clergy.

The tradition of wearing graduation hats in Sweden has been in place since the mid-eighteenth century. The cap is typically a white sailor hat with a black or dark blue band around it, a crown motif, and a black peak at the front. The graduation hat tradition was initially adopted by students at Uppsala University. The headgear then became popular across several other European nations as well.

== Ceremony ==
Usually, the ceremony and name apply to university or college degrees: Associate's, Bachelor's, Master's and Doctoral degrees.

In a graduation ceremony for a college or university, the presiding officer or other authorized person formally confers degrees upon candidates, either individually or en masse. However, some graduates may physically receive their diploma later at smaller college or departmental ceremonies, or even through the mail.

Ceremonies often include a procession of some of the academic staff, candidates, and a valediction. The students typically wear formal academic dress, such as square academic caps and gowns. The academic staff will usually also wear academic dress at the ceremony, as will the trustees (if applicable).

=== Graduation in absentia ===
When a student graduates without attending the graduation ceremony, then it is called graduation in absentia.

=== Non-tertiary graduations ===
In the United States and Israel, completing high school is also referred to as "graduating", with a high school diploma or Bagrut certificate, respectively. Graduations from high school typically occur between the months of June and August. Oftentimes, completing middle school or kindergarten is also marked by a graduation ceremony.

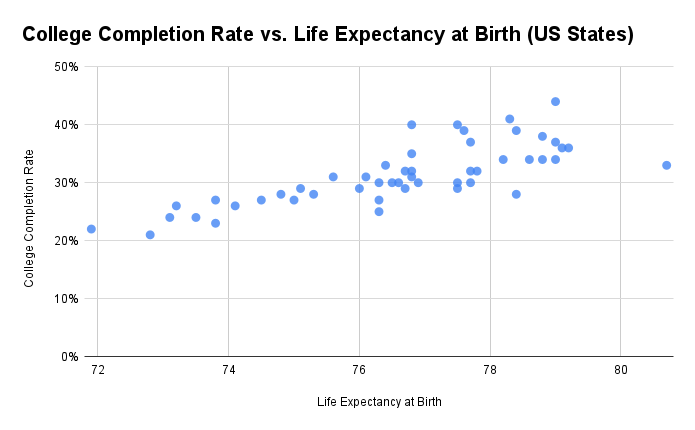
College Completion Rates in the United States versus Life Expectancy at Birth, per CDC (2021)

== By country ==
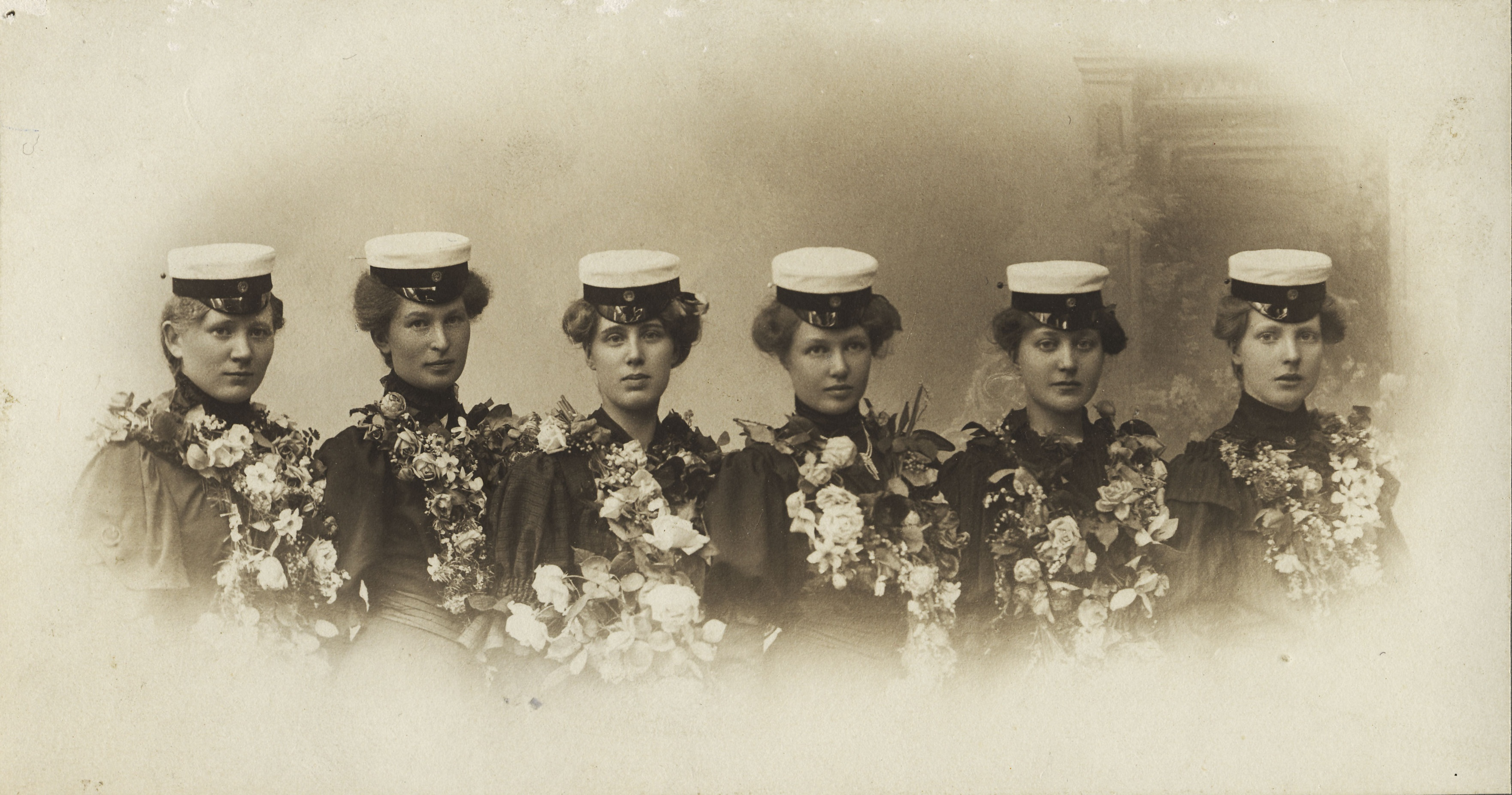
Female Finnish students graduating from high school, in 1906

The procedures and traditions surrounding academic graduation ceremonies differ around the world. In the United Kingdom a graduation usually only occurs at university level. Whereas in the United States and many other countries, graduations also occur at high schools where no higher education qualifications are awarded to the graduates.

In Sweden, most universities are research-oriented and may present their students with bachelor's, master's, and doctor's degrees covering all academic streams. Universities across the country are based through the Higher Education Ordinance. Most of the national programs provide Swedish, English, math and science among degree courses.

In India, nowadays, a passing out ceremony or a promotion ceremony from one level to another starting from preschools like from Nursery to Junior is also referred to as a Graduation Ceremony.

In Zimbabwe, graduation ceremonies are often associated with the guest of honor who most often is the ceremonial head of the institution. At state universities the president of the country officiates as chancellor and guest of honor. Every graduate of a state university in Zimbabwe can claim to have shaken the President's hand. The person most associated with graduation at those institutions is Zimbabwe's late ex-president Robert Mugabe. At other state institutions of higher learning, the vice presidents or other senior government officials may preside.

In countries like Argentina and Uruguay, celebrants are more enthusiastic by taking part in an authentic carnival as part of the largely spontaneous celebration on the streets. Hundreds of graduates, familiars and friends gather in an open place carrying alcoholic drinks, eggs, flour and other foods to throw at the graduates. The public and wasteful nature of this celebration draws complaints from commerce, neighbours and authorities in the zone due to the concentration of public disorder and litter that lasts until the aftermath and overwhelms the municipal services.

== See also ==
- Academic dress – Ceremonial clothing used at graduations
- Commencement speech – Speech given to graduating students
- Encaenia – Academic or ecclesiastical ceremony
- Exit examination – High school leaving examination
- Honorary degree – Academic qualification awarded without usual requirements
- Matriculation – Entering a university
