= Avicenna =

Persian polymath, physician and philosopher (c. 980–1037)

Avicenna Ibn Sina
- ابن سینا
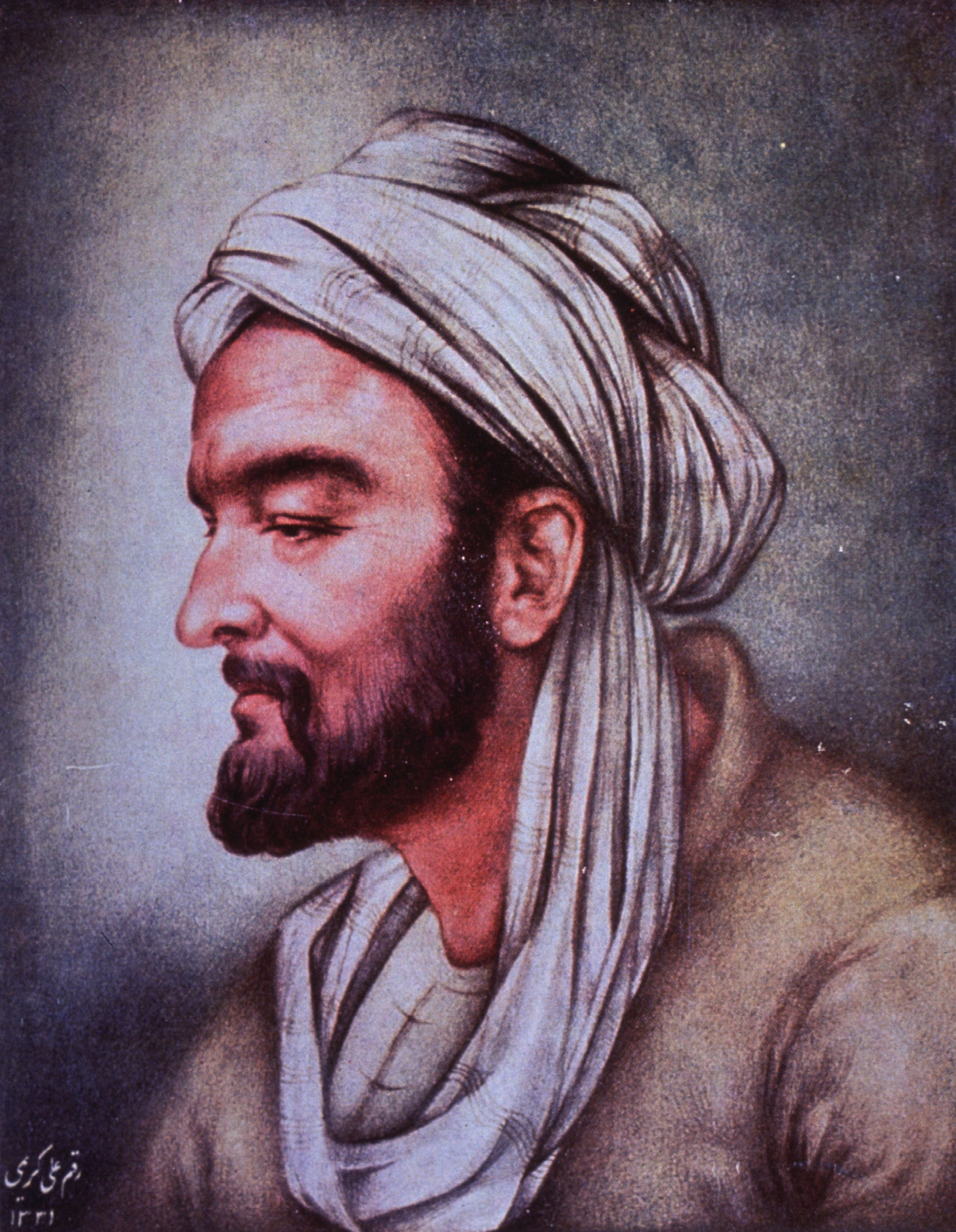
- Modern portrait of Ibn Sina, National Library of Medicine (1952)
- Born: c. 980; Afshana, Transoxiana, Samanid Empire
- Died: 22 June 1037 (aged 56–57); Hamadan, Kakuyid Emirate
- Resting place: Avicenna Mausoleum, Hamadan, Iran
- Other names: Sharaf al-Mulk (شرف الملك) Hujjat al-Haq (حجة الحق) al-Sheikh al-Ra'is (الشيخ الرئيس); Bu Alī Sīnā (بو علی سینا)

Philosophical work
- Era: Islamic Golden Age
- Region: Middle Eastern philosophy: Persian philosophy
- School: Aristotelianism, Avicennism
- Main interests: Medicine; Aromatherapy; Philosophy and logic; Kalām (Islamic theology); Science; Poetry
- Notable works: The Book of Healing; The Canon of Medicine

Ibn Sina (Note: Persian and Arabic: ابن سینا, romanized: Ibn Sīnā) (c. 980 – 22 June 1037), commonly known in the West as Avicenna (Note: /ˌævɪˈsɛnə, ˌɑːv-/ A(H)V-ih-SEN-ə), was a preeminent philosopher and physician of the Muslim world. He was a seminal figure of the Islamic Golden Age, serving in the courts of various Iranian rulers, and was influential to medieval European medical and Scholastic thought. Avicenna is considered one of the greatest thinkers and medical scholars in history.

Often described as the father of early modern medicine, Avicenna's most famous works are The Book of Healing, a philosophical and scientific encyclopedia, and The Canon of Medicine, a medical encyclopedia that became a standard medical text at many medieval European universities and remained in use as late as 1650.

Besides philosophy and medicine, Avicenna's corpus includes writings on astronomy, alchemy, geography and geology, psychology, Islamic theology, logic, mathematics, physics, and works of poetry. His philosophy was of the Peripatetic school derived from Aristotelianism, of which he is considered among the greatest proponents within the Muslim world.

Avicenna wrote most of his philosophical and scientific works in Arabic but also wrote several key works in Persian; his poetry was written in both languages. Of the 450 works he is believed to have written, around 240 have survived, including 150 on philosophy and 40 on medicine.

Avicenna is also known for his unique methodological approach to his works. He combines a unique blend of empirical observation, philosophical reasoning, and logical analysis, in order to conduct his analysis and reach his conclusions. This is especially the case in his medical works, namely The Canon of Medicine.

== Name ==
Avicenna is a Latinized version of the Arabic patronym ibn Sīnā (ابن سينا), indicating that he is the descendant of a line of men going back to one named Sina. Specifically, Avicenna was the great-great-grandson of a Sina. His full formal Arabic name is Abū ʿAlī al-Ḥusayn bin ʿAbdallāh bin al-Ḥasan bin ʿAlī bin Sīnā al-Balkhī al-Bukhārī (أبو علي الحسين بن عبد الله بن الحسن بن علي بن سينا البلخي البخاري).

== Historical context ==
Avicenna created an extensive corpus of works during what is commonly known as the Islamic Golden Age, in which the translations of Byzantine, Greco-Roman, Persian, and Indian texts were studied extensively. Greco-Roman (Middle Platonic, Neoplatonic, and Aristotelian) texts translated by the Kindi school were commented on, redacted and developed substantially by Islamic intellectuals, who also built upon Persian and Indian mathematical systems, astronomy, algebra, trigonometry and medicine.

The Samanid Empire in the eastern part of Persia, Greater Khorasan, and Central Asia, as well as the Buyid dynasty in the western part of Persia and Iraq, provided a thriving atmosphere for scholarly and cultural development. Under the Samanids, Bukhara rivaled Baghdad for cultural capital of the Muslim world. There, Avicenna had access to the great libraries of Balkh, Khwarazm, Gorgan, Rey, Isfahan and Hamadan.

Various texts (such as the 'Ahd with Bahmanyar) show that Avicenna debated philosophical points with the greatest scholars of the time. Nizami Aruzi described how before ibn Sina left Khwarazm, he had met al-Biruni (a scientist and astronomer), Abu Nasr Mansur (a renowned mathematician), Abu Sahl 'Isa ibn Yahya al-Masihi (a respected philosopher) and ibn al-Khammar (a great physician). The study of the Quran and the Hadith also thrived, and Islamic philosophy, fiqh "jurisprudence", and kalam "speculative theology" were all further developed by ibn Sina and his opponents at this time.

== Biography ==
=== Early life and education ===
Avicenna was born in c. 980 in the village of Afshana in Transoxiana to a Persian family. The village was near the Samanid capital of Bukhara, which was his mother's hometown. His father Abd Allah was a native of the city of Balkh in Bactria. An official of the Samanid bureaucracy, the father had served as the governor of a village of the royal estate of Harmaytan near Bukhara during the reign of Nuh II (r. 976–997). Avicenna also had a younger brother. A few years later, the family settled in Bukhara, a center of learning, which attracted many scholars. It was there that Avicenna was educated, which early on was seemingly administered by his father.

Although both Avicenna's father and brother had converted to Isma'ilism, he himself did not follow the faith. He was instead a Hanafi Sunni, the same school followed by the Samanids. Avicenna's parents recognized his brilliance from a very young age and hired tutors in Arabic language and Islamic knowledge to set him on the path towards intellectual thinking.

Avicenna was first schooled in the Quran and literature, and by the age of 10, he had memorized the entire Quran. He was later sent by his father to an Indian greengrocer, who taught him arithmetic. Afterwards, he was schooled in fiqh by the Hanafi jurist Ismail al-Zahid. Sometime later, his father invited the physician and philosopher al-Natili to their house to educate ibn Sina. Together, they studied the Isagoge of Porphyry (died 305) and possibly the Categories of Aristotle (died 322 BCE) as well. After Avicenna had read the Almagest of Ptolemy (died 170) and Euclid's Elements, al-Natili told him to continue his research independently. By the time Avicenna was 18, he was well-educated in Greek sciences. Although ibn Sina mentions only al-Natili as his teacher in his autobiography, he most likely had other teachers as well, such as the physicians Qumri and Abu Sahl 'Isa ibn Yahya al-Masihi.

=== Career ===
==== In Bukhara and Gurganj ====
Map of Khurasan and Transoxiana

At the age of 17, Avicenna was made a physician of Nuh II. By the time Avicenna was at least 21 years old, his father died. He was subsequently given an administrative post, possibly succeeding his father as the governor of Harmaytan. Avicenna later moved to Gurganj, the capital of Khwarazm, which he reports that he did due to "necessity". The date he went to the place is uncertain, as he reports that he served the Khwarazmshah, the ruler of Khwarazm, the Ma'munid ruler Abu al-Hasan Ali. The latter ruled from 997 to 1009, which indicates that Avicenna moved sometime during that period.

He may have moved in 999, the year in which the Samanid Empire fell after the Kara-Khanid Khanate captured Bukhara and imprisoned the Samanid emir Abd al-Malik II. Due to his high position and strong connection with the Samanids, ibn Sina may have found himself in an unfavorable position after the fall of his suzerain.

It was through the minister of Gurganj, Abu'l-Husayn as-Sahi, a patron of Greek sciences, that Avicenna entered into the service of Abu al-Hasan Ali. Under the Ma'munids, Gurganj became a centre of learning, attracting many prominent figures, such as ibn Sina and his former teacher Abu Sahl al-Masihi, the mathematician Abu Nasr Mansur, the physician ibn al-Khammar, and the philologist al-Tha'alibi.

==== In Gorgan ====
Avicenna later moved due to "necessity" once more (in 1012), this time to the west. There he travelled through the Khurasani cities of Nasa, Abivard, Tus, Samangan and Jajarm. He was planning to visit the ruler of the city of Gorgan, the Ziyarid Qabus (r. 977–981, 997–1012), a cultivated patron of writing, whose court attracted many distinguished poets and scholars. However, when Avicenna eventually arrived, he discovered that the ruler had been dead since the winter of 1013. Avicenna then left Gorgan for Dihistan, but returned after becoming ill. There he met Abu 'Ubayd al-Juzjani (died 1070) who became his pupil and companion. Avicenna stayed briefly in Gorgan, reportedly serving Qabus's son and successor Manuchihr (r. 1012–1031) and resided in the house of a patron.

==== In Ray and Hamadan ====
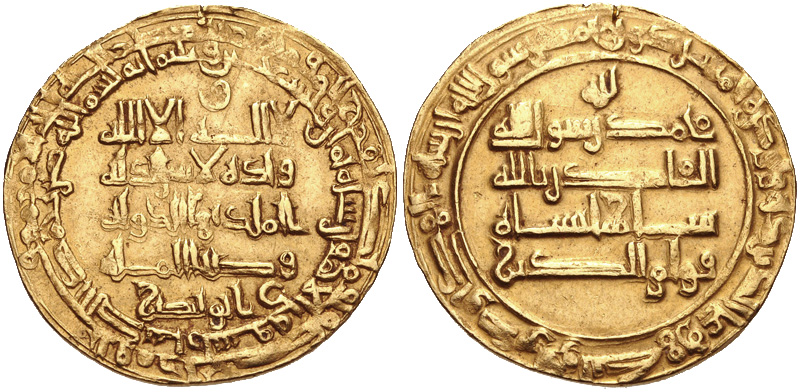
Coin of Majd al-Dawla (r. 997–1029), the amir (ruler) of the Buyid branch of Ray

In c. 1014, Avicenna went to the city of Ray, where he entered into the service of the Buyid amir Majd al-Dawla (r. 997–1029) and his mother Sayyida Shirin, the de facto ruler of the realm. There he served as the physician at the court, treating Majd al-Dawla, who was suffering from melancholia. Avicenna reportedly later served as the "business manager" of Sayyida Shirin in Qazvin and Hamadan, though details regarding this tenure are unclear. During this period, Avicenna finished writing The Canon of Medicine and started writing his The Book of Healing.

In 1015, during Avicenna's stay in Hamadan, he participated in a public debate, as was customary for newly arrived scholars in western Iran at that time. The purpose of the debate was to examine one's reputation against a prominent resident. The person whom Avicenna debated against was Abu'l-Qasim al-Kirmani, a member of the school of philosophers of Baghdad. The debate became heated, resulting in ibn Sina accusing Abu'l-Qasim of lack of basic knowledge in logic, while Abu'l-Qasim accused ibn Sina of rudeness and impoliteness.

After the debate, Avicenna sent a letter to the Baghdad Peripatetics, asking if Abu'l-Qasim's claim that he shared the same opinion as them was true. Abu'l-Qasim later retaliated by writing a letter to an unknown person in which he made accusations so serious that ibn Sina wrote to Abu Sa'd, the deputy of Majd al-Dawla, to investigate the matter. The accusation made towards Avicenna may have been the same as he had received earlier, in which he was accused by the people of Hamadan of copying the stylistic structures of the Quran in his Sermons on Divine Unity. The seriousness of this charge, in the words of the historian Peter Adamson, "cannot be underestimated in the larger Muslim culture".

Not long afterwards, Avicenna shifted his allegiance to the rising Buyid amir Shams al-Dawla, the younger brother of Majd al-Dawla, which Adamson suggests was due to Abu'l-Qasim also working under Sayyida Shirin. Avicenna had been called upon by Shams al-Dawla to treat him, but after the latter's campaign in the same year against his former ally, the Annazid ruler Abu Shawk (r. 1010–1046), he forced Avicenna to become his vizier.

Although Avicenna would sometimes clash with Shams al-Dawla's troops, he remained vizier until the latter died of colic in 1021. Avicenna was asked to stay as vizier by Shams al-Dawla's son and successor Sama' al-Dawla (r. 1021–1023), but he instead went into hiding with his patron, Abu Ghalib al-Attar, to wait for better opportunities to emerge. It was during this period that Avicenna was secretly in contact with Ala al-Dawla Muhammad (r. 1008–1041), the Kakuyid ruler of Isfahan and uncle of Sayyida Shirin.

It was during his stay at Attar's home that Avicenna completed The Book of Healing, writing 50 pages a day. The Buyid court in Hamadan, particularly the Kurdish vizier Taj al-Mulk, suspected Avicenna of correspondence with Ala al-Dawla, and as a result, had the house of Attar ransacked and ibn Sina imprisoned in the fortress of Fardajan, outside Hamadan. Juzjani blames one of ibn Sina's informers for his capture. He was imprisoned for four months until Ala al-Dawla captured Hamadan, ending Sama al-Dawla's reign.

==== In Isfahan ====
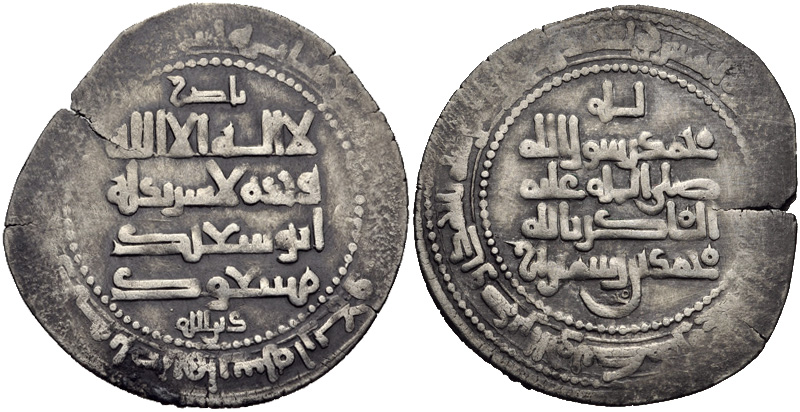
Coin of Ala al-Dawla Muhammad (r. 1008–1041), the Kakuyid ruler of Isfahan

Avicenna was subsequently released, and went to Isfahan, where he was well received by Ala al-Dawla. In the words of Juzjani, the Kakuyid ruler gave Avicenna "the respect and esteem which someone like him deserved". Adamson also says that Avicenna's service under Ala al-Dawla "proved to be the most stable period of his life". Avicenna served as the advisor, if not vizier of Ala al-Dawla, accompanying him in many of his military expeditions and travels. Avicenna dedicated two Persian works to him, a philosophical treatise named Danish-nama-yi Ala'i ("Book of Science for Ala"), and a medical treatise about the pulse.

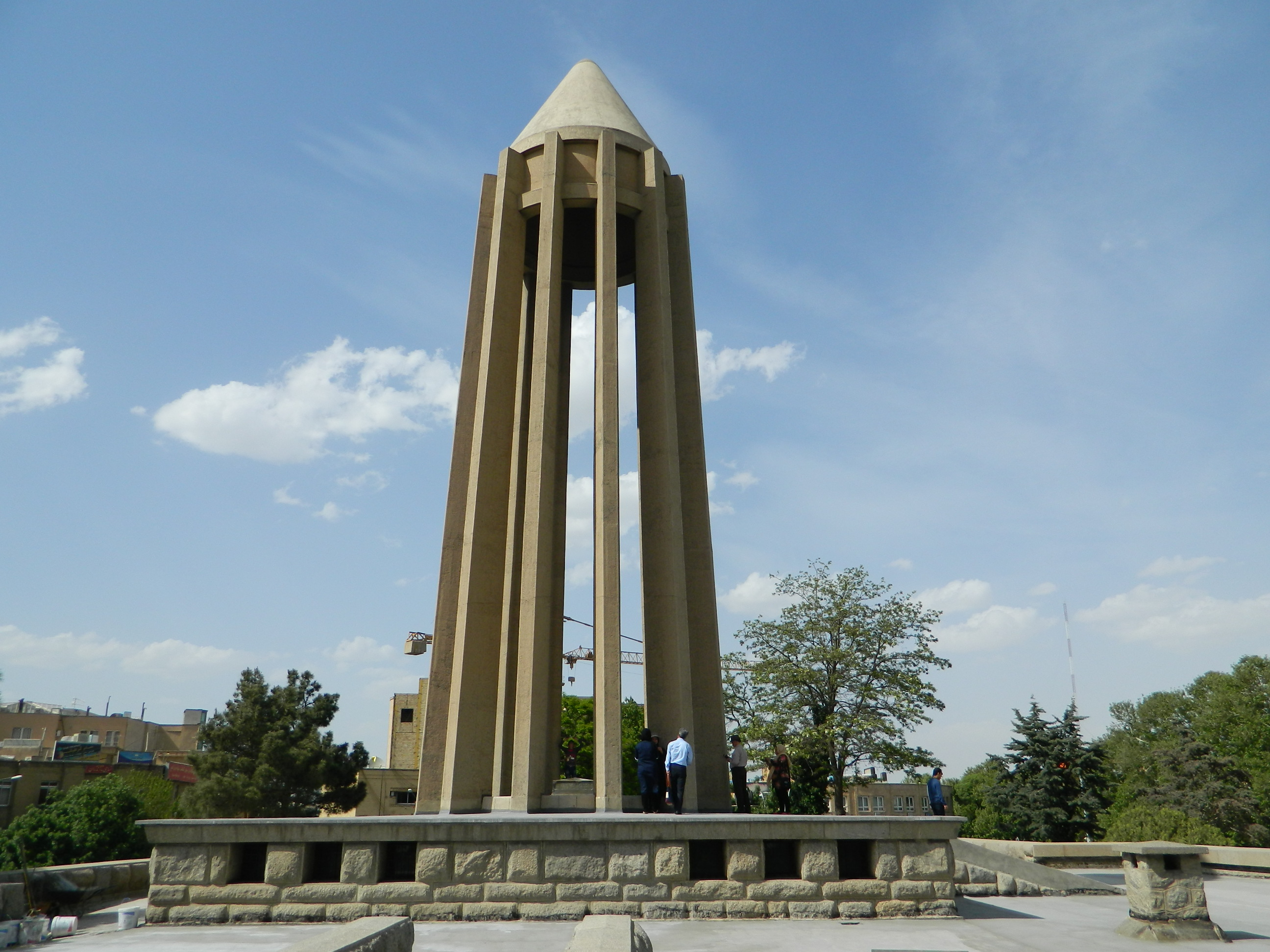
The Mausoleum of Avicenna, Hamadan, Iran

During the brief occupation of Isfahan by the Ghaznavids in January 1030, Avicenna and Ala al-Dawla relocated to the southwestern Iranian region of Khuzistan, where they stayed until the death of the Ghaznavid ruler Mahmud (r. 998–1030), which occurred two months later. It was seemingly when Avicenna returned to Isfahan that he started writing his Pointers and Reminders. In 1037, while Avicenna was accompanying Ala al-Dawla to a battle near Isfahan, he contracted a severe colic, having suffered from colic throughout his life. He died shortly afterwards in Hamadan, where he was buried.

== Philosophy ==
Avicenna wrote extensively on early Islamic philosophy, especially the subjects logic, ethics and metaphysics, including treatises named Logic and Metaphysics. Most of his works were written in Arabic, then the language of science in the Muslim world, and some in Early New Persian. Of linguistic significance even to this day are a few books that he wrote in Persian, particularly the Danishnama. Avicenna's commentaries on Aristotle often criticized the philosopher, encouraging a lively debate in the spirit of ijtihad.

Avicenna's Neoplatonic scheme of emanations became fundamental in kalam in the 12th century.

The Book of Healing became available in Europe in a partial Latin translation some fifty years after its composition under the title Sufficientia, and some authors have identified a "Latin Avicennism" as flourishing for some time paralleling the more influential Latin Averroism, but it was suppressed by the Parisian decrees of 1210 and 1215.

Avicenna's psychology and theory of knowledge influenced the theologian William of Auvergne and Albertus Magnus, while his metaphysics influenced the thought of Thomas Aquinas.

=== Metaphysical doctrine ===
Early Islamic philosophy and Islamic metaphysics, imbued as it is with kalam, distinguishes between essence and existence more clearly than Aristotelianism. Whereas existence is the domain of the contingent and the accidental, essence endures within a being beyond the accidental. The philosophy of Avicenna, particularly that part relating to metaphysics, owes much to al-Farabi. The search for a definitive Islamic philosophy separate from Occasionalism can be seen in what is left of his work.

Following al-Farabi's lead, Avicenna initiated a full-fledged inquiry into the question of being, in which he distinguished between essence (Arabic: ماهية, romanized: māhiya) and existence (Arabic: وجود, romanized: wujūd). He argued that the fact of existence cannot be inferred from or accounted for by the essence of existing things, and that form and matter by themselves cannot interact and originate the movement of the universe or the progressive actualization of existing things. Existence must, therefore, be due to an agent-cause that necessitates, imparts, gives, or adds existence to an essence. To do so, the cause must be an existing thing and coexist with its effect. This is known as the concept of the "efficient cause." According to Avicenna, the efficient cause or efficient agent is defined as that which gives being to something distinct from itself. God is used as a modeling agent for this philosophy. The efficient cause "gives being to another and is simultaneous with its effect."

==== Impossibility, contingency, necessity ====
Avicenna's consideration of the essence-attributes question may be elucidated in terms of his ontological analysis of the modalities of being; namely impossibility, contingency and necessity. Avicenna argued that the impossible being is that which cannot exist, while the contingent in itself (mumkin bi-dhatihi) has the potentiality to be or not to be without entailing a contradiction. When actualized, the contingent becomes a 'necessary existent due to what is other than itself' (wajib al-wujud bi-ghayrihi). Thus, contingency-in-itself is potential beingness that could eventually be actualized by an external cause other than itself. The metaphysical structures of necessity and contingency are different. Necessary being due to itself (wajib al-wujud bi-dhatihi) is true in itself, while the contingent being is 'false in itself' and 'true due to something else other than itself'. The necessary is the source of its own being without borrowed existence. It is what always exists.

==== Differentia ====
The Necessary exists 'due-to-Its-Self', and has no quiddity/essence other than existence. Furthermore, It is 'One' (wahid ahad) since there cannot be more than one 'Necessary-Existent-due-to-Itself' without differentia (fasl) to distinguish them from each other. Yet, to require differentia entails that they exist 'due-to-themselves' as well as 'due to what is other than themselves'; and this is contradictory. If no differentia distinguishes them from each other, then, in no sense are these 'Existents' not the same. Avicenna adds that the 'Necessary-Existent-due-to-Itself' has no genus (jins), nor a definition (hadd), nor a counterpart (nadd), nor an opposite (did), and is detached (bari) from matter (madda), quality (kayf), quantity (kam), place (ayn), situation (wad) and time (waqt).

==== Reception ====
Avicenna's theology on metaphysical issues (ilāhiyyāt) has been criticized by some Islamic scholars, among them al-Ghazali, ibn Taymiyya, and ibn Qayyim al-Jawziyya. While discussing the views of the theists among the Greek philosophers, namely Socrates, Plato and Aristotle in Al-Munqidh min ad-Dalal "Deliverance from Error", al-Ghazali noted:

[the Greek philosophers] must be taxed with unbelief, as must their partisans among the Muslim philosophers, such as Avicenna and al-Farabi and their likes. None, however, of the Muslim philosophers engaged so much in transmitting Aristotle's lore as did the two men just mentioned. [...] The sum of what we regard as the authentic philosophy of Aristotle, as transmitted by al-Farabi and Avicenna, can be reduced to three parts: a part which must be branded as unbelief; a part which must be stigmatized as innovation; and a part which need not be repudiated at all.

=== Argument for God's existence ===
Avicenna made an argument for the existence of God which would be known as the "Proof of the Truthful" (burhān al-ṣiddīqīn). Avicenna argued that there must be a Proof of the Truthful, an entity that cannot not exist and through a series of arguments, he identified it with God in Islam. Present-day historian of philosophy Peter Adamson called this argument one of the most influential medieval arguments for God's existence, and Avicenna's biggest contribution to the history of philosophy.

=== Al-Biruni correspondence ===
Correspondence between ibn Sina with his student Ahmad ibn ʿAli al-Maʿsumi and al-Biruni has survived in which they debated Aristotelian natural philosophy and the Peripatetic school. al-Biruni began by asking eighteen questions, ten of which were criticisms of Aristotle's On the Heavens.

=== Theology ===
Ibn Sina was a devout Muslim and sought to reconcile rational philosophy with Islamic theology. He aimed to prove the existence of God and His creation of the world scientifically and through reason and logic. His views on Islamic theology and philosophy were enormously influential, forming part of the core of the curriculum at Islamic religious schools until the 19th century.

Avicenna wrote several short treatises dealing with Islamic theology. These included treatises on the prophets and messengers in Islam, whom he viewed as "inspired philosophers", and also on various scientific and philosophical interpretations of the Quran, such as how Quranic cosmology corresponds to his philosophical system. In general, these treatises linked his philosophical writings to Islamic religious ideas; for example, the body's afterlife.

There are occasional brief hints and allusions in his longer works, however, that Avicenna considered philosophy as the only sensible way to distinguish real prophecy from illusion. He did not state this more clearly because of the political implications of such a theory if prophecy could be questioned, and also because most of the time he was writing shorter works which concentrated on explaining his theories on philosophy and theology clearly, without digressing to consider epistemological matters which could only be properly considered by other philosophers.

Later interpretations of Avicenna's philosophy split into three different schools; those (such as al-Tusi) who continued to apply his philosophy as a system to interpret later political events and scientific advances; those (such as al-Razi) who considered Avicenna's theological works in isolation from his wider philosophical concerns; and those (such as al-Ghazali) who selectively used parts of his philosophy to support their own attempts to gain greater spiritual insights through a variety of mystical means. It was the theological interpretation championed by those such as al-Razi which eventually came to predominate in the madrasahs.

Avicenna memorized the Quran by the age of ten, and as an adult, wrote five treatises commenting on surahs of the Quran. One of these texts included the Proof of Prophecies, in which he comments on several Quranic verses and holds the Quran in high esteem. Avicenna argued that the Islamic prophets should be considered higher than philosophers.

Avicenna is generally understood to have been aligned with the Hanafi school of Sunni thought. Avicenna studied Hanafi law, many of his notable teachers were Hanafi jurists, and he served under the Hanafi court of Ali ibn Mamun. Avicenna said at an early age that he remained "unconvinced" by Ismaili missionary attempts to convert him.

Medieval historian Ẓahīr al-dīn al-Bayhaqī (d. 1169) believed Avicenna to be a follower of the Brethren of Purity.

=== Thought experiments ===
While he was imprisoned in the castle of Fardajan near Hamadhan, Avicenna wrote his famous "floating man"—literally falling man—a thought experiment to demonstrate human self-awareness and the substantiality and immateriality of the soul. Avicenna believed his "Floating Man" thought experiment demonstrated that the soul is a substance, and claimed humans cannot doubt their own consciousness, even in a situation that prevents all sensory data input. The thought experiment told its readers to imagine themselves created all at once while suspended in the air, isolated from all sensations, which includes no sensory contact with even their own bodies. He argued that, in this scenario, one would still have self-consciousness. Because it is conceivable that a person, suspended in air while cut off from sense experience, would still be capable of determining his own existence, the thought experiment points to the conclusions that the soul is a perfection, independent of the body, and an immaterial substance. The conceivability of this "Floating Man" indicates that the soul is perceived intellectually, which entails the soul's separateness from the body. Avicenna referred to the living human intelligence, particularly the active intellect, which he believed to be the hypostasis by which God communicates truth to the human mind and imparts order and intelligibility to nature. Following is an English translation of the argument:

One of us (i.e. a human being) should be imagined as having been created in a single stroke; created perfect and complete but with his vision obscured so that he cannot perceive external entities; created falling through air or a void, in such a manner that he is not struck by the firmness of the air in any way that compels him to feel it, and with his limbs separated so that they do not come in contact with or touch each other. Then contemplate the following: can he be assured of the existence of himself? He does not have any doubt in that his self exists, without thereby asserting that he has any exterior limbs, nor any internal organs, neither heart nor brain, nor any one of the exterior things at all; but rather he can affirm the existence of himself, without thereby asserting there that this self has any extension in space. Even if it were possible for him in that state to imagine a hand or any other limb, he would not imagine it as being a part of his self, nor as a condition for the existence of that self; for as you know that which is asserted is different from that which is not asserted and that which is inferred is different from that which is not inferred. Therefore the self, the existence of which has been asserted, is a unique characteristic, in as much that it is not as such the same as the body or the limbs, which have not been ascertained. Thus that which is ascertained (i.e. the self), does have a way of being sure of the existence of the soul as something other than the body, even something non-bodily; this he knows, this he should understand intuitively, if it is that he is ignorant of it and needs to be beaten with a stick [to realize it].

— Ibn Sina, Kitab Al-Shifa, On the Soul

However, Avicenna posited the brain as the place where reason interacts with sensation. Sensation prepares the soul to receive rational concepts from the universal Agent Intellect. The first knowledge of the flying person would be "I am," affirming his or her essence. That essence could not be the body, obviously, as the flying person has no sensation. Thus, the knowledge that "I am" is the core of a human being: the soul exists and is self-aware. Avicenna thus concluded that the idea of the self is not logically dependent on any physical thing, and that the soul should not be seen in relative terms, but as a primary given, a substance. The body is unnecessary; in relation to it, the soul is its perfection. In itself, the soul is an immaterial substance.

== Principal works ==
=== The Canon of Medicine ===
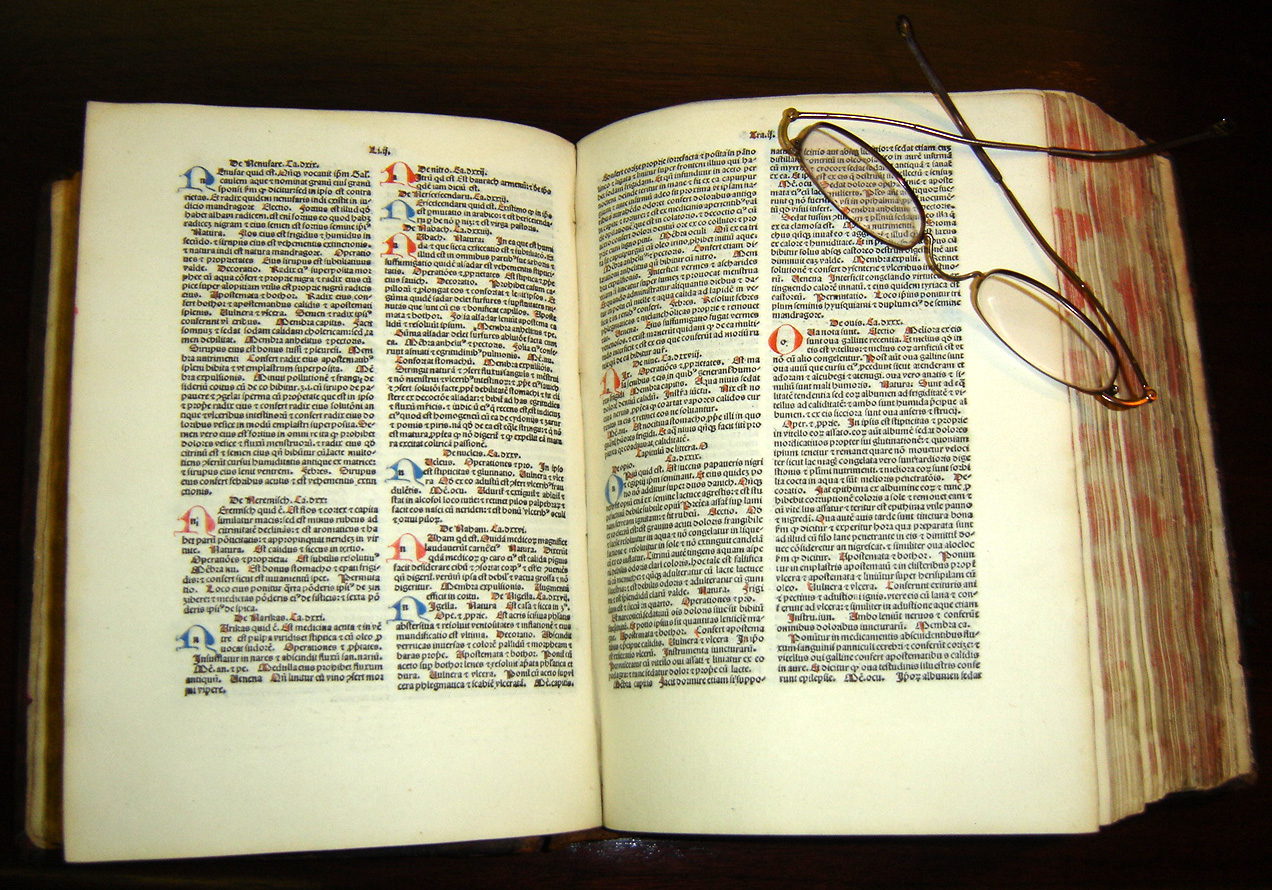
Canons of medicine book from Avicenna, Latin translation located at UT Health of San Antonio

Avicenna authored a five-volume comprehensive medical encyclopedia, The Canon of Medicine (Arabic: القانون في الطب, romanized: al-Qānūn fī l-ṭibb). The work is structured into five distinct books: the first covers general principles of medicine, the second outlines medicinal substances and their properties, the third discusses disease and treatments, the fourth is dedicated to health maintenance, and the fifth is about specific ailments and their cures.

In The Canon of Medicine, he notably postulated that invisible tainted organisms were associated with disease, and recommended isolating ill individuals to reduce transmission to others. It was used as the standard medical textbook in the Islamic world and Europe up to the 18th century. The Canon still plays an important role in Unani medicine.

=== Liber Primus Naturalium ===
Avicenna considered whether events like rare diseases or disorders have natural causes. He used the example of polydactyly to explain his perception that causal reasons exist for all medical events. This view of medical phenomena anticipated developments in the Enlightenment by seven centuries.

=== The Book of Healing ===
The Book of Healing is another encyclopedia written by Avicenna. He began writing the book in 1014 and completed it around 1020, It was published in 1027. This work is Ibn Sina's major work on science and philosophy, and is intended to "cure" or "heal" ignorance of the soul. Despite its title, it is not concerned with medicine, in contrast to Avicenna's earlier The Canon of Medicine (5 vols.).

The book is divided into four parts: logic, natural sciences, mathematics (a quadrivium of arithmetic, geometry, astronomy), and metaphysics. It was influenced by ancient Greek philosophers such as Aristotle; Hellenistic thinkers such as Ptolemy; and earlier Persian/Muslim scientists and philosophers, such as Al-Kindi (Alkindus), Al-Farabi (Alfarabi), and Al-Bīrūnī.

==== Earth sciences ====
Avicenna wrote on Earth sciences such as geology in The Book of Healing. While discussing the formation of mountains, he explained:

Either they are the effects of upheavals of the crust of the earth, such as might occur during a violent earthquake, or they are the effect of water, which, cutting itself a new route, has denuded the valleys, the strata being of different kinds, some soft, some hard ... It would require a long period of time for all such changes to be accomplished, during which the mountains themselves might be somewhat diminished in size.

==== Philosophy of science ====
In the Al-Burhan (On Demonstration) section of The Book of Healing, Avicenna discussed the philosophy of science and described an early scientific method of inquiry. He discussed Aristotle's Posterior Analytics and significantly diverged from it on several points. Avicenna discussed the issue of a proper methodology for scientific inquiry and the question of "How does one acquire the first principles of a science?" He asked how a scientist would arrive at "the initial axioms or hypotheses of a deductive science without inferring them from some more basic premises?" He explained that the ideal situation is when one grasps that a "relation holds between the terms, which would allow for absolute, universal certainty". Avicenna then added two further methods for arriving at the first principles: the ancient Aristotelian method of induction (istiqra), and the method of examination and experimentation (tajriba). Avicenna criticized Aristotelian induction, arguing that "it does not lead to the absolute, universal, and certain premises that it purports to provide." In its place, he developed a "method of experimentation as a means for scientific inquiry."

==== Logic ====
An early formal system of temporal logic was studied by Avicenna. Although he did not develop a real theory of temporal propositions, he did study the relationship between temporalis and the implication. Avicenna's work was further developed by Najm al-Dīn al-Qazwīnī al-Kātibī and became the dominant system of Islamic logic until modern times. Avicennian logic also influenced several early European logicians such as Albertus Magnus and William of Ockham. Avicenna endorsed the law of non-contradiction proposed by Aristotle, that a fact could not be both true and false at the same time and in the same sense of the terminology used. He stated, "Anyone who denies the law of non-contradiction should be beaten and burned until he admits that to be beaten is not the same as not to be beaten, and to be burned is not the same as not to be burned."

==== Physics ====
In mechanics, Avicenna, in The Book of Healing, developed a theory of motion, in which he made a distinction between the inclination (tendency to motion) and force of a projectile, and concluded that motion was a result of an inclination (mayl) transferred to the projectile by the thrower, and that projectile motion in a vacuum would not cease. He viewed inclination as a permanent force whose effect is dissipated by external forces such as air resistance.

The theory of motion presented by Avicenna was probably influenced by the 6th-century Alexandrian scholar John Philoponus. Avicenna's is a less sophisticated variant of the theory of impetus developed by Buridan in the 14th century. It is unclear if Buridan was influenced by Avicenna, or by Philoponus directly.

In optics, Avicenna was among those who argued that light had a speed, observing that "if the perception of light is due to the emission of some sort of particles by a luminous source, the speed of light must be finite." He also provided a wrong explanation of the rainbow phenomenon. Carl Benjamin Boyer described Avicenna's ("Ibn Sīnā") theory on the rainbow as follows:

Independent observation had demonstrated to him that the bow is not formed in the dark cloud but rather in the very thin mist lying between the cloud and the sun or observer. The cloud, he thought, serves as the background of this thin substance, much as a quicksilver lining is placed upon the rear surface of the glass in a mirror. Ibn Sīnā would change the place not only of the bow, but also of the color formation, holding the iridescence to be merely a subjective sensation in the eye.

In 1253, a Latin text entitled Speculum Tripartitum stated the following regarding Avicenna's theory on heat:

Avicenna says in his book of heaven and earth, that heat is generated from motion in external things.

==== Psychology ====
Avicenna's legacy in classical psychology is primarily embodied in the Kitab al-nafs parts of his Kitab al-shifa (The Book of Healing) and Kitab al-najat (The Book of Deliverance). These were known in Latin under the title De Anima (treatises "on the soul"). Notably, Avicenna develops what is called the Flying Man argument in the Psychology of The Cure I.1.7 as defence of the argument that the soul is without quantitative extension, which has an affinity with Descartes's cogito argument (or what phenomenology designates as a form of an "epoche").

Avicenna's psychology requires that connection between the body and soul be strong enough to ensure the soul's individuation, but weak enough to allow for its immortality. Avicenna grounds his psychology on physiology, which means his account of the soul is one that deals almost entirely with the natural science of the body and its abilities of perception. Thus, the philosopher's connection between the soul and body is explained almost entirely by his understanding of perception; in this way, bodily perception interrelates with the immaterial human intellect. In sense perception, the perceiver senses the form of the object; first, by perceiving features of the object by our external senses. This sensory information is supplied to the internal senses, which merge all the pieces into a whole, unified conscious experience. This process of perception and abstraction is the nexus of the soul and body, for the material body may only perceive material objects, while the immaterial soul may only receive the immaterial, universal forms. The way the soul and body interact in the final abstraction of the universal from the concrete particular is the key to their relationship and interaction, which takes place in the physical body.

The soul completes the action of intellection by accepting forms that have been abstracted from matter. This process requires a concrete particular (material) to be abstracted into the universal intelligible (immaterial). The material and immaterial interact through the Active Intellect, which is a "divine light" containing the intelligible forms. The Active Intellect reveals the universals concealed in material objects much like the sun makes colour available to our eyes.

Avicenna used psychological methods as a way of treating his patients. According to one anecdote:

a malnourished prince of Persia had melancholia, refused to eat and suffered from the delusion that he was a cow. The prince would moo like a cow crying, “Kill me so that a good stew may be made of my flesh” and would not eat anything. Ibn Sina was persuaded to the case and sent a message to the patient, asking him to be happy as the butcher was coming to slaughter him, and the sick man rejoiced. When Ibn Sina approached the prince with a knife in his hand, he asked “where is the cow so I may kill it.” The patient then mooed like a cow to indicate where he was. By order of the butcher, the patient was also laid on the ground for slaughter. When Ibn Sina approached the patient pretending to slaughter him, he said, “The cow is too lean and not ready to be killed. It must be fed properly and I will kill it when it becomes healthy and fat.” The patient was then offered food which he ate eagerly and gradually “gained strength, got rid of his delusion, and was completely cured.”

== Other contributions ==
=== Astronomy and astrology ===
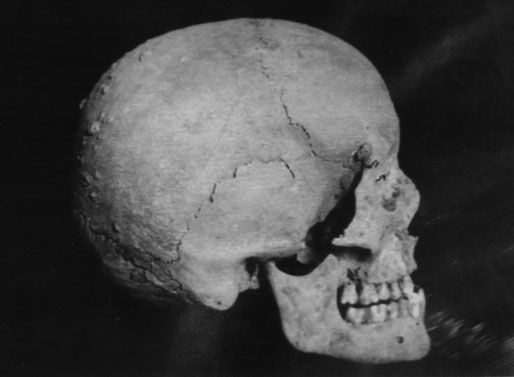
Skull of Avicenna, found in 1950 during construction of the new mausoleum

Avicenna wrote an attack on astrology titled Missive on the Champions of the Rule of the Stars (رسالة في ابطال احكم النجوم) in which he cited passages from the Quran to dispute the power of astrology to foretell the future. He believed that each classical planet had some influence on the Earth but argued against current astrological practices.

Avicenna's astronomical writings had some influence on later writers, although in general his work could be considered less developed than that of ibn al-Haytham or al-Biruni. One important feature of his writing is that he considers mathematical astronomy a separate discipline from astrology. He criticized Aristotle's view of the stars receiving their light from the Sun, stating that the stars are self-luminous, and believed that the planets are also self-luminous. He claimed to have observed the transit of Venus. This is possible as there was a transit on 24 May 1032, but ibn Sina did not give the date of his observation and modern scholars have questioned whether he could have observed the transit from his location at that time; he may have mistaken a sunspot for Venus. He used his transit observation to help establish that Venus was, at least sometimes, below the Sun in the geocentric model, i.e. the sphere of Venus comes before the sphere of the Sun when moving out from the Earth.

He also wrote the Summary of the Almagest based on Ptolemy's Almagest with an appended treatise "to bring that which is stated in the Almagest and what is understood from Natural Science into conformity". For example, ibn Sina considers the motion of the solar apsis, which Ptolemy had taken to be fixed.

=== Chemistry ===
Avicenna was first to derive the attar of flowers from distillation and used steam distillation to produce essential oils such as rose essence, which he used as aromatherapeutic treatments for heart conditions.

Unlike al-Razi, Avicenna explicitly disputed the theory of the transmutation of substances commonly believed by alchemists:

Those of the chemical craft know well that no change can be effected in the different species of substances, though they can produce the appearance of such change.

Four works on alchemy attributed to Avicenna were translated into Latin as:

- Liber Aboali Abincine de Anima in arte Alchemiae
- Declaratio Lapis physici Avicennae filio sui Aboali
- Avicennae de congelatione et conglutinatione lapidum
- Avicennae ad Hasan Regem epistola de Re recta

Liber Aboali Abincine de Anima in arte Alchemiae was the most influential, having influenced later medieval chemists and alchemists such as Vincent of Beauvais. However, Anawati argues (following Ruska) that the De Anima is a forgery by a Spanish author. Similarly the Declaratio is believed not to be actually by Avicenna. The third work (The Book of Minerals) is agreed to be Avicenna's writing, adapted from the Kitab al-Shifa (Book of the Remedy). Avicenna classified minerals into stones, fusible substances, sulfurs and salts, building on the ideas of Aristotle and Jabir. The epistola de Re recta is somewhat less sceptical of alchemy; Anawati argues that it is by Avicenna, but written earlier in his career when he had not yet firmly decided that transmutation was impossible.

=== Poetry ===
Almost half of Avicenna's works are versified. His poems appear in both Arabic and Persian. As an example, Edward Granville Browne claims that the following Persian verses are incorrectly attributed to Omar Khayyám, and were originally written by Ibn Sīnā:

از قعر گل سیاه تا اوج زحل
کردم همه مشکلات گیتی را حل
بیرون جستم زقید هر مکر و حیل
هر بند گشاده شد مگر بند اجل

Translation:

From the depth of the black earth up to Saturn's apogee,
All the problems of the universe have been solved by me.
I have escaped from the coils of snares and deceits;
I have unraveled all knots except the knot of Death.

== Legacy ==
=== Classical Islamic civilization ===
Robert Wisnovsky, a scholar of Avicenna attached to McGill University, says that "Avicenna was the central figure in the long history of the rational sciences in Islam, particularly in the fields of metaphysics, logic and medicine" but that his works did not only have an influence in these "secular" fields of knowledge alone, as "these works, or portions of them, were read, taught, copied, commented upon, quoted, paraphrased and cited by thousands of post-Avicennian scholars—not only philosophers, logicians, physicians and specialists in the mathematical or exact sciences, but also by those who specialized in the disciplines of ʿilm al-kalām (rational theology, but understood to include natural philosophy, epistemology and philosophy of mind) and usūl al-fiqh (jurisprudence, but understood to include philosophy of law, dialectic, and philosophy of language)."

=== Medieval and Renaissance Europe ===
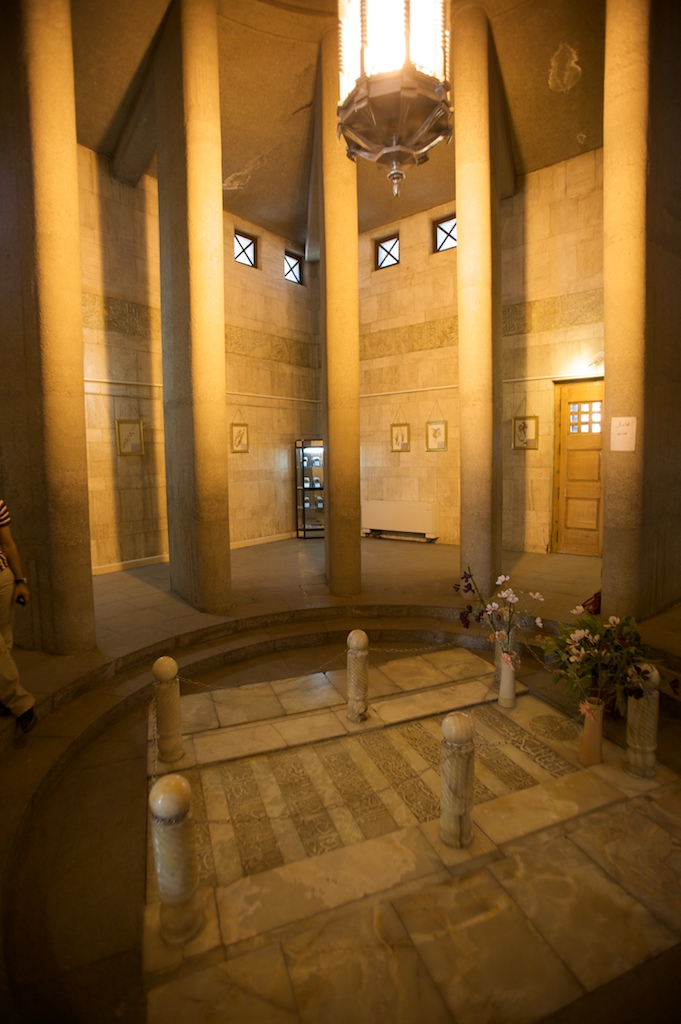
Inside view of the Avicenna Mausoleum, designed by Hooshang Seyhoun in 1945–1950

As early as the 14th century when Dante Alighieri depicted him in Limbo alongside the virtuous non-Christian thinkers in his Divine Comedy such as Virgil, Averroes, Homer, Horace, Ovid, Lucan, Socrates, Plato and Saladin. Avicenna has been recognized by both East and West as one of the great figures in intellectual history. Johannes Kepler cites Avicenna's opinion when discussing the causes of planetary motions in Chapter 2 of Astronomia Nova.

George Sarton, the author of The History of Science, described Avicenna as "one of the greatest thinkers and medical scholars in history" and called him "the most famous scientist of Islam and one of the most famous of all races, places, and times". He was one of the Islamic world's leading writers in the field of medicine.

Peter Adamson, the historian of philosophy, described Avicenna as "the single most influential medieval philosopher", and noted that"he was the only medieval thinker to exert significant influence in all three Abrahamic traditions: Islam, Judaism, and Christianity."Adamson 2016, pp. 118–119

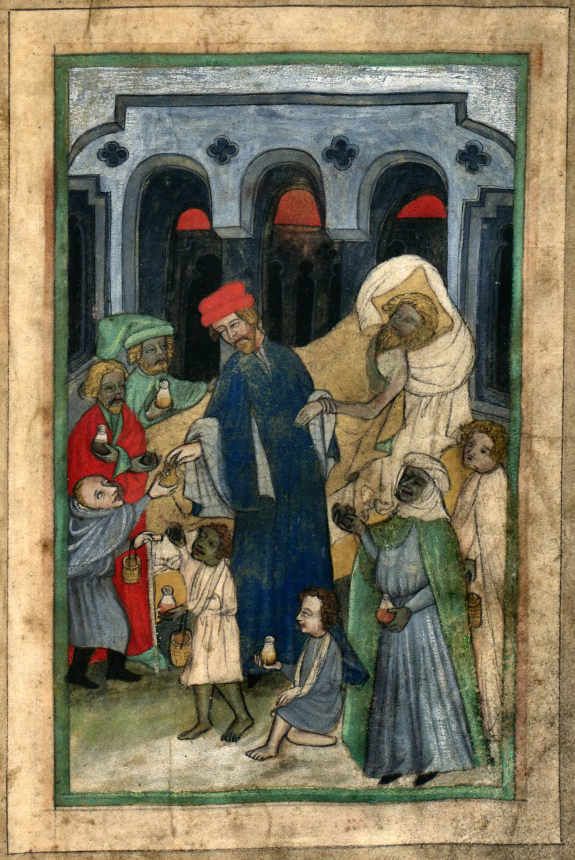
Avicenna at the sickbed, miniature by Walenty z Pilzna, Kraków (c. 1479–1480)

Along with Rhazes, Abulcasis, Ibn al-Nafis and al-Ibadi, Avicenna is considered an important compiler of early Muslim medicine. He is remembered in the Western history of medicine as a major historical figure who made important contributions to medicine and the European Renaissance. His medical texts were unusual in that where controversy existed between Galen and Aristotle's views on medical matters (such as anatomy), he preferred to side with Aristotle, where necessary updating Aristotle's position to take into account post-Aristotelian advances in anatomical knowledge. Aristotle's dominant intellectual influence among medieval European scholars meant that Avicenna's linking of Galen's medical writings with Aristotle's philosophical writings in the Canon of Medicine (along with its comprehensive and logical organisation of knowledge) significantly increased Avicenna's importance in medieval Europe in comparison to other Islamic writers on medicine. His influence following translation of the Canon was such that from the early fourteenth to the mid-sixteenth centuries he was ranked with Hippocrates and Galen as one of the acknowledged authorities, princeps medicorum ("prince of physicians").

Avicenna is also less known for his advanced work on cardiology. In this field, he was responsible for many innovative firsts. He developed and corrected prior information about pulse correction from Galen and Chinese physicians, being regarded as the "pioneer of pulsology" as a result. Avicenna was also the first person to describe, with accuracy, "a symptom of vasovagal syncope known as carotid sinus hypersensitivity in his third book of The Canon." On this topic, he also discovered the association between inner feelings and one's pulse rate, describing it as the "love-sickness phenomenon."

Other miscellenaeous but original contributions of Avicenna include the recognition of the contagious nature of tuberculosis, spread of disease via water and soil, and the broader interaction between psychology and physical health. He described various pharmacological methods, while also writing a book describing 760 different drugs which became the most authentic work on the subject for that era. He also wrote a book on cardiac drugs, titled al-adwiyat al-Qalbia.

=== Modern reception ===
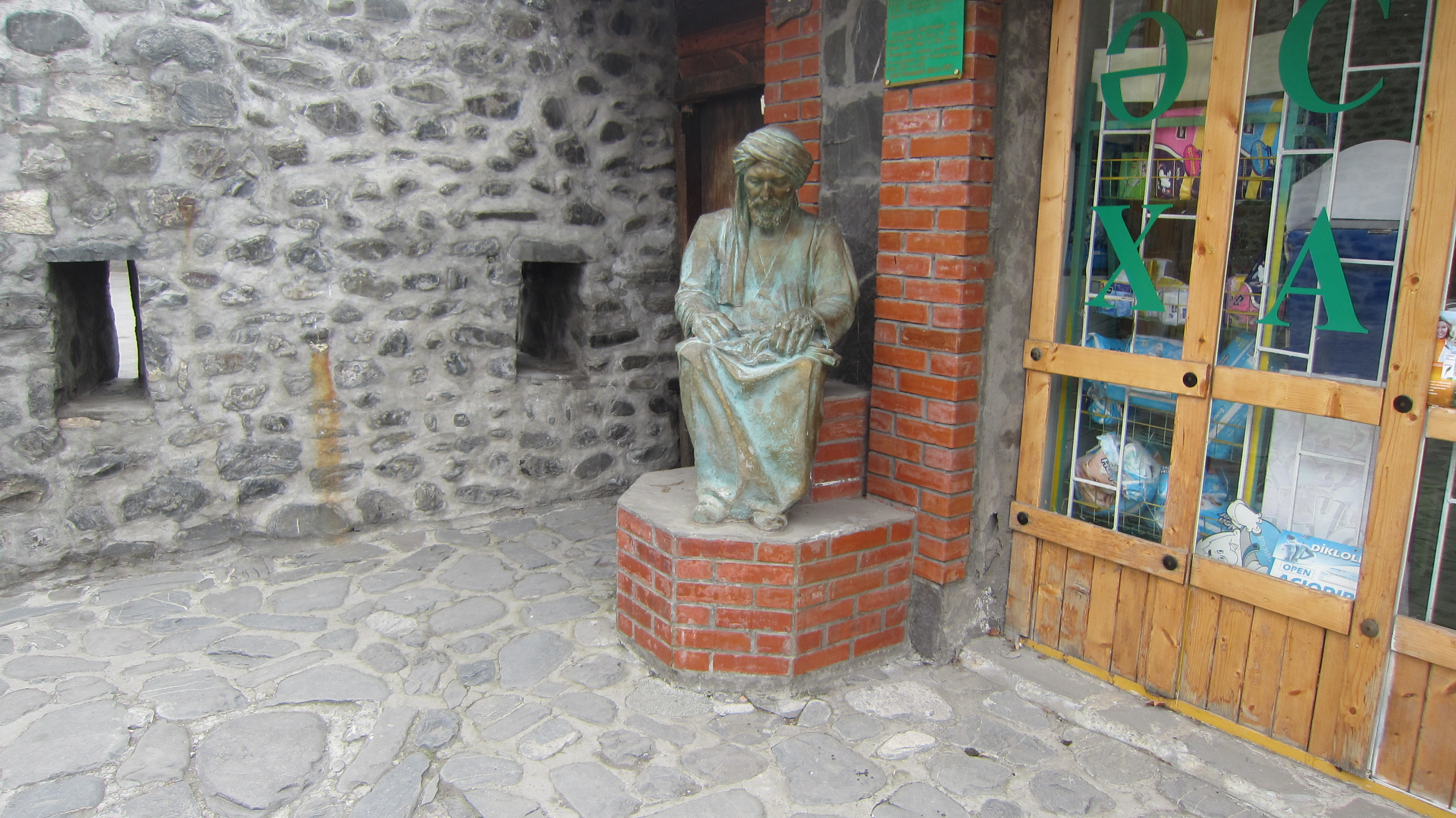
A monument to Avicenna in Qakh (city), Azerbaijan

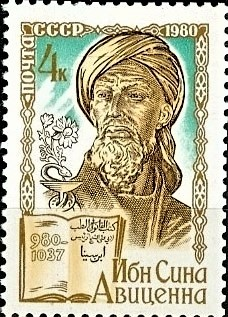
The Soviet Union in 1980 published a stamp entitled "1000th anniversary of the birth of Ibn Sina"

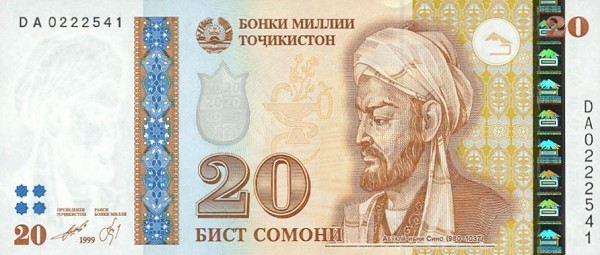
Image of Avicenna on the Tajikistani somoni

Institutions in a variety of counties have been named after Avicenna in honour of his scientific accomplishments, including the Avicenna Mausoleum and Museum, Bu-Ali Sina University, Avicenna Research Institute and Ibn Sina Academy of Medieval Medicine and Sciences. There is also a crater on the Moon named Avicenna.

The Avicenna Prize, established in 2003, is awarded every two years by UNESCO and rewards individuals and groups for their achievements in the field of ethics in science.

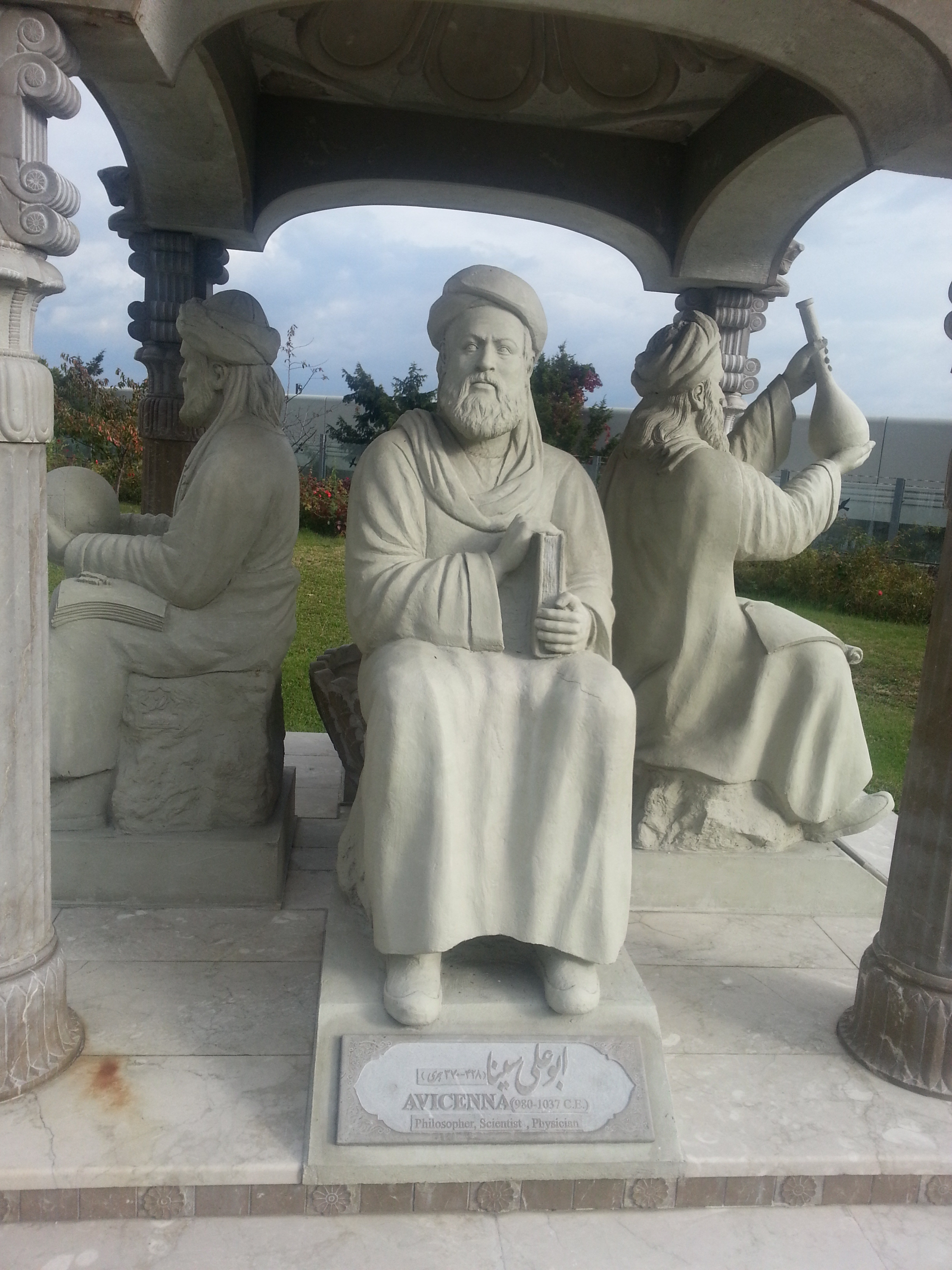
The statue of Avicenna in United Nations Office in Vienna as a part of the Persian Scholars Pavilion donated by Iran

The Avicenna Directories (2008–2015; now the World Directory of Medical Schools) list universities and schools where doctors, public health practitioners, pharmacists and others, are educated. The original project team stated:

Why Avicenna? Avicenna ... was ... noted for his synthesis of knowledge from both east and west. He has had a lasting influence on the development of medicine and health sciences. The use of Avicenna's name symbolises the worldwide partnership that is needed for the promotion of health services of high quality.

In June 2009, Iran donated a "Persian Scholars Pavilion" to the United Nations Office in Vienna. It now sits in the Vienna International Center.

==== In popular culture ====
The 1982 Soviet film Youth of Genius (Russian: Юность гения, romanized: Yunost geniya) by Elyor Ishmukhamedov recounts Avicenna's younger years. The film is set in Bukhara at the turn of the millennium.

In Louis L'Amour's 1985 historical novel The Walking Drum, Kerbouchard studies and discusses Avicenna's The Canon of Medicine.

In his book The Physician (1988) Noah Gordon tells the story of a young English medical apprentice who disguises himself as a Jew to travel from England to Persia and learn from Avicenna, the great master of his time. The novel was adapted into a feature film, The Physician, in 2013. Avicenna was played by Ben Kingsley.

He appears in 2025's Civilization VII as a Great Person for the Abbasid civilization. When used, Avicenna creates a hospital with 2 extra food points.

== List of works ==
The treatises of Avicenna influenced later Muslim thinkers in many areas including theology, philology, mathematics, astronomy, physics and music. His works numbered almost 450 volumes on a wide range of subjects, of which around 240 have survived. In particular, 150 volumes of his surviving works concentrate on philosophy and 40 of them concentrate on medicine. His most famous works are The Book of Healing, and The Canon of Medicine.

Avicenna wrote at least one treatise on alchemy, but several others have been falsely attributed to him. His Logic, Metaphysics, Physics, and De Caelo, are treatises giving a synoptic view of Aristotelian doctrine, though Metaphysics demonstrates a significant departure from the brand of Neoplatonism known as Aristotelianism in Avicenna's world; Arabic philosophers have hinted at the idea that Avicenna was attempting to "re-Aristotelianise" Muslim philosophy in its entirety, unlike his predecessors, who accepted the conflation of Platonic, Aristotelian, Neo- and Middle-Platonic works transmitted into the Muslim world.

The Logic and Metaphysics have been extensively reprinted, the latter, e.g., at Venice in 1493, 1495 and 1546. Some of his shorter essays on medicine, logic, etc., take a poetical form (the poem on logic was published by Schmoelders in 1836). Two encyclopedic treatises, dealing with philosophy, are often mentioned. The larger, Al-Shifa' (Sanatio), exists nearly complete in manuscript in the Bodleian Library and elsewhere; part of it on the De Anima appeared at Pavia (1490) as the Liber Sextus Naturalium, and the long account of Avicenna's philosophy given by Muhammad al-Shahrastani seems to be mainly an analysis, and in many places a reproduction, of the Al-Shifa'. A shorter form of the work is known as the An-najat (Liberatio). The Latin editions of part of these works have been modified by the corrections which the monastic editors confess that they applied. There is also a حكمت مشرقيه (hikmat-al-mashriqqiyya, in Latin Philosophia Orientalis), mentioned by Roger Bacon, the majority of which was lost in antiquity, which according to Averroes was pantheistic in tone.

Avicenna's works further include:

- Sirat al-shaykh al-ra'is (The Life of Avicenna), ed. and trans. WE. Gohlman, Albany, NY: State University of New York Press, 1974. (The only critical edition of Avicenna's autobiography, supplemented with material from a biography by his student Abu 'Ubayd al-Juzjani. A more recent translation of the Autobiography appears in D. Gutas, Avicenna and the Aristotelian Tradition: Introduction to Reading Avicenna's Philosophical Works, Leiden: Brill, 1988; second edition 2014.)
- Al-isharat wa al-tanbihat (Remarks and Admonitions), ed. S. Dunya, Cairo, 1960; parts translated by S.C. Inati, Remarks and Admonitions, Part One: Logic, Toronto, Ont.: Pontifical Institute for Mediaeval Studies, 1984, and Ibn Sina and Mysticism, Remarks and Admonitions: Part 4, London: Kegan Paul International, 1996.
- Al-Qanun fi'l-tibb (The Canon of Medicine), ed. I. a-Qashsh, Cairo, 1987. (Encyclopedia of medicine.) manuscript, Latin translation, Flores Avicenne, Michael de Capella, 1508, Modern text. Ahmed Shawkat Al-Shatti, Jibran Jabbur.
- Risalah fi sirr al-qadar (Essay on the Secret of Destiny), trans. G. Hourani in Reason and Tradition in Islamic Ethics, Cambridge: Cambridge University Press, 1985.
- Danishnama "The Book of Scientific Knowledge", ed. and trans. P. Morewedge, The Metaphysics of Avicenna, London: Routledge and Kegan Paul, 1973.
- The Book of Healing, Avicenna's major work on philosophy. He probably began to compose al-Shifa' in 1014, and completed it in 1020. Critical editions of the Arabic text have been published in Cairo, 1952–83, originally under the supervision of I. Madkour.
- Kitab al-Najat "The Book of Salvation", translated by F. Rahman, Avicenna's Psychology: An English Translation of Kitab al-Najat, Book II, Chapter VI with Historical-philosophical Notes and Textual Improvements on the Cairo Edition, Oxford: Oxford University Press, 1952. (The psychology of al-Shifa'.) (Digital version of the Arabic text)
- Risala fi'l-Ishq "A Treatise on Love". Translated by Emil L. Fackenheim.

=== Persian works ===
Avicenna's most important Persian work is the Danishnama (دانشنامه علائی, "Book of Knowledge". Avicenna created a new scientific vocabulary that had not previously existed in Persian. The Danishnama covers such topics as logic, metaphysics, music theory and other sciences of his time. It has been translated into English by Parwiz Morewedge in 1977. The book is also important in respect to Persian scientific works.

Andar Dānish-i Rag (اندر دانش رگ, "On the Science of the Pulse") contains nine chapters on the science of the pulse and is a condensed synopsis.

Persian poetry from Avicenna is recorded in various manuscripts and later anthologies such as Nozhat al-Majales.

== See also ==
- Al-Qumri (possibly Avicenna's teacher)
- Abdol Hamid Khosro Shahi (Iranian theologian)
- Mummia (Persian medicine)
- Eastern philosophy
- Iranian philosophy
- Islamic philosophy
- Contemporary Islamic philosophy
- Science in the medieval Islamic world
- List of scientists in medieval Islamic world
- Sufi philosophy
- Science and technology in Iran
- Ancient Iranian medicine
- List of pre-modern Iranian scientists and scholars

=== Namesakes of Ibn Sina ===
- Ibn Sina Academy of Medieval Medicine and Sciences in Aligarh
- Avicenna Bay in Antarctica
- Avicenna (crater) on the far side of the Moon
- Avicenna Cultural and Scientific Foundation
- Avicenne Hospital in Paris, France
- Avicenna International College in Budapest, Hungary
- Avicenna Mausoleum (complex dedicated to Avicenna) in Hamadan, Iran
- Avicenna Research Institute in Tehran, Iran
- Avicenna Tajik State Medical University in Dushanbe, Tajikistan
- Bu-Ali Sina University in Hamedan, Iran
- Ibn Sina Peak on the Kyrgyzstan–Tajikistan border
- Ibn Sina Foundation in Houston, Texas
- Ibn Sina Hospital, Baghdad, Iraq
- Ibn Sina Hospital, Istanbul, Turkey
- Ibn Sina Medical College Hospital, Dhaka, Bangladesh
- Ibn Sina University Hospital of Rabat-Salé at Mohammed V University in Rabat, Morocco
- Ibne Sina Hospital, Multan, Punjab, Pakistan
- International Ibn Sina Clinic, Dushanbe, Tajikistan

== Notes ==
=== Sources ===
- Adamson, Peter (2013). Interpreting Avicenna: Critical Essays. Leiden: Brill. ISBN 978-0-521-19073-2. Archived from the original on 6 April 2023.
- Adamson, Peter (2016). Philosophy in the Islamic World: A history of philosophy without any gaps, Volume 3. Oxford University Press. ISBN 978-0-19-957749-1.
- Bennison, Amira K. (2009). The great caliphs: the golden age of the 'Abbasid Empire. New Haven: Yale University Press. ISBN 978-0-300-15227-2.
- Bosworth, Clifford Edmund (1978). "K̲h̲wārazm-S̲h̲āhs". In van Donzel, E.; Lewis, B.; Pellat, Ch. & Bosworth, C. E. (eds.). The Encyclopaedia of Islam, Second Edition. Volume IV: Iran–Kha. Leiden: E. J. Brill. ISBN 978-90-04-05745-6. OCLC 758278456.
- Bosworth, Clifford Edmund (1984a). "Āl-e Maʾmūn". Encyclopaedia Iranica, Vol. I, Fasc. 7. pp. 762–764. Archived from the original on 19 October 2021.
- Bosworth, Clifford Edmund (1984b). "ʿAlāʾ-al-dawla Moḥammad". Encyclopaedia Iranica, Vol. I, Fasc. 7. pp. 773–774. Archived from the original on 3 September 2021.
- Copleston, Frederick (1993). A History of Philosophy, Volume 2: Medieval Philosophy – From Augustine to Duns Scotus. Image Books. ISBN 978-0-385-46844-2.
- Corbin, Henry (1998). The Voyage and the messenger: Iran and philosophy. North Atlantic Books. ISBN 9781556432699.
- Corbin, Henry (19 April 2016). Avicenna and the Visionary Recital. Princeton University Press. ISBN 978-0-691-63054-0. Archived from the original on 24 May 2019.
- Daftary, Farhad (2007). Ismaili History and Intellectual Traditions. The Isma'ilis: Their History and Doctrines. ISBN 978-0-521-85084-1.
- Daftary, Farhad (2017). Ismaili History and Intellectual Traditions. Routledge. ISBN 978-1-138-28810-2.
- Daly, Jonathan (19 December 2013). The Rise of Western Power: A Comparative History of Western Civilization. A&C Black. ISBN 978-1-4411-1851-6.
- El-Bizri, Nader (2006). "Ibn Sina, or Avicenna". In Meri, Josef W. (ed.). Medieval Islamic Civilization: An Encyclopedia. Vol. 1. New York: Routledge. pp. 369–370. ISBN 978-0-415-96691-7.
- Glick, Thomas F.; Livesey, Steven John; Wallis, Faith (2005). Medieval Science, Technology, and Medicine: An Encyclopedia. Psychology Press. ISBN 978-1-138-05670-1.
- Goichon, A.M (1986). "Ibn Sīnā". In Lewis, B.; Ménage, V. L.; Pellat, Ch. & Schacht, J. (eds.). The Encyclopaedia of Islam, Second Edition. Volume III: H–Iram. Leiden: E. J. Brill. OCLC 495469525.
- Gutas, Dimitri (1987). "Avicenna ii. Biography". In Yarshater, Ehsan (ed.). Encyclopædia Iranica. Vol. III/1: Ātaš–Awāʾel al-Maqālāt. London and New York: Routledge & Kegan Paul. pp. 67–70. ISBN 978-0-71009-113-0.
- Gutas, Dimitri (1988). "Avicenna's Maḏhab with an appendix on the question of his date of Birth". Quaderni di Studi Arabi. 6: 323–336. JSTOR 25802612. (registration required)
- Gutas, Dimitri (2014). Avicenna and the Aristotelian Tradition: Introduction to Reading Avicenna's Philosophical Works. Second, Revised and Enlarged Edition, Including an Inventory of Avicenna's Authentic Works. Leiden: Brill. ISBN 978-9004201729.
- Khalidi, Muhammad Ali (2005). Medieval Islamic Philosophical Writings. Cambridge University Press. ISBN 978-0-521-82243-5.
- Lazard, G. (1975). "The Rise of the New Persian Language". In Frye, Richard N. (ed.). The Cambridge History of Iran: From the Arab Invasion to the Saljuqs. Vol. 4. Cambridge: Cambridge University Press. pp. 595–633. ISBN 0-521-20093-8.
- Madelung, Wilferd (1975). "The Minor Dynasties of Northern Iran". In Frye, Richard N. (ed.). The Cambridge History of Iran: From the Arab Invasion to the Saljuqs. Vol. 4. Cambridge: Cambridge University Press. pp. 595–633. ISBN 0-521-20093-8.
- Pasnau, Robert; Dyke, Christina Van (2010). Cambridge History of Medieval Philosophy, Volume 1. Cambridge University Press.
