= Avicenna Cultural and Scientific Foundation =

Iranian non-governmental organization (2005–present)

- Avicenna Scientific and Cultural Foundation
- Formation: January 26, 2005
- Founded at: Iran
- Locations: Hamedan, Iran; Paris, France
- Coordinates: 34.79141922016674°N 48.5132837173412°E
- Website: www.buali.ir/en/home

Avicenna Scientific and Cultural Foundation (Persian: بنیاد علمی و فرهنگی بوعلی‌سینا, romanized: Bonyad-e Elmi Va Farhangi-ye Bu Ali Sina) is a non-profit non-governmental institution whose focus is on the life and works of the Persian polymath Abū ʿAlī al-Ḥusayn ibn ʿAbd Allāh ibn Al-Hasan ibn Ali ibn Sīnā (Avicenna or Ibn Sina). The foundation showcases his character and work, honoring his universal position, encouraging national and international researchers to produce distinguished works, as well as enhancing cultural and scientific activities.

== The president of the foundation ==
The president of the foundation holds the highest-ranking executive post and is elected by the board of trustees as well as the order of the board of trustees' secretary for a four-year term, which can be renewed for another term.

== See also ==
- Avicenna
- Avicenna Mausoleum
- Philosopher
- Physician
