= Avicenna Research Institute =

Medical research institute in Tehran, Iran

- پژوهشگاه ابن سینا
- Type: Research institute
- Established: 1998
- Founders: Mohammad Mehdi Ahmad Akhondi
- President: Mohammadreza Sadeghi
- Location: Tehran, Tehran province, Iran
- Website: avicenna.ac.ir

Avicenna Research Institute (ARI; Persian: پژوهشگاه ابن سینا) – affiliated to ACECR – was established in Tehran in order to achieve medical technologies through clinical and laboratory research projects, in 1998. The institute consists of three research centers, including the Reproductive Biotechnology Research Center (RBRC), the Monoclonal Antibody Research Center (MARC), and the Nanobiotechnology Research Center (NBRC). ARI also includes the Avicenna Biotechnology Incubator and the Avicenna Infertility Clinic (AIC).

Named after Ibn Sina, the research institute was founded in 1998 at Shahid Beheshti University in Tehran.

The most prominent missions of the ARI are as follows:

- Conducting basic, applied, and therapeutic research projects in the fields of reproduction and cancer treatment
- Identifying and fulfilling requirements related to biotechnologies in diagnostic and therapeutic areas
- Attracting M.Sc. and Ph.D. students to conduct research
- Arranging postgraduate courses on modern technologies in collaboration with different universities
- Giving information, publishing books and journals, as well as holding national, regional, and international conferences
