= Dimitri Gutas =

American academic and professor of Arabic and Islamic studies (born 1945)

- Born: 1945 (age 80–81)

Academic background
- Education: Yale University (PhD)
- Thesis: Greek Wisdom Literature in Arabic Translation: A Study in the Literary Transmission of Popular Ethics (1974)
- Doctoral advisor: Franz Rosenthal

Academic work
- Era: Contemporary philosophy
- Institutions: Yale University

Dimitri Gutas (Greek: Δημήτρης Γούτας; born 1945, in Cairo) is an American Arabist and Hellenist specialized in medieval Islamic philosophy, who serves as professor emeritus of Arabic and Islamic Studies in the Department of Near Eastern Languages and Civilizations at Yale University.

== Biography ==
Gutas was born in Cairo, Egypt, and educated across the Eastern Mediterranean. He attended Robert Academy in Istanbul, graduating in 1965. He then enrolled at Yale University, where he completed all his higher education: a B.A. in 1969, summa cum laude), M.A. in 1969, and Ph.D. in 1974.

== Academic career ==
Gutas spent the majority of his academic career at Yale University, where he taught in the Department of Near Eastern Languages and Civilizations. He served as Assistant Professor from 1976 to 1982, Associate Professor from 1982 to 1985, and Professor of Arabic and Graeco-Arabic from 1989 to 2018. He was named Professor Emeritus in 2018.

Before returning to Yale as a full professor, he held a professorship in Arabic and Islamic Studies at the University of Crete from 1985 to 1989, where he also served as Chair of the Department of History and Archaeology. He held visiting appointments at institutions including Harvard University, Princeton University, and Leiden University. In 1994, he was offered the Chair of Arabic Studies at Frankfurt University, which he declined.

== Research and scholarship ==
A major aspect of Gutas’s scholarship lies in philology and the study of textual transmission. He has made significant contributions to lexicography as co-founder, with Gerhard Endress, of A Greek and Arabic Lexicon, an ongoing reference work on the vocabulary of medieval Arabic translations from Greek. He has also contributed to textual scholarship through his work on Project Theophrastus, dedicated to collecting and editing the fragments of Theophrastus, the successor of Aristotle. In addition, he produced a critical edition and translation of Theophrastus, On First Principles, presenting both the Greek original and its medieval Arabic versions with detailed commentary. His work in this area is notable for integrating classical philology with Arabic and Islamic intellectual history, thereby bridging traditionally distinct fields of scholarship.

=== Graeco-Arabic translation movement ===
Gutas is best known for his groundbreaking study of the transmission of Greek knowledge into the Islamic world. His book Greek Thought, Arabic Culture: The Graeco-Arabic Translation Movement in Baghdad and Early ʿAbbāsid Society (1998) redefined the field by situating the translation movement within its social, political, and ideological context. The work argues that the translation of Greek texts into Arabic during the Abbasid period constituted a major cultural renaissance that later influenced the development of European intellectual history. The book has been widely described as a “classic” and has been translated into multiple languages.

=== Islamic philosophy and Avicenna ===
Gutas has made foundational contributions to the study of Islamic philosophy, particularly through his work on Avicenna. His book Avicenna and the Aristotelian Tradition (1988) is considered a landmark study that reshaped modern understanding of Avicenna’s philosophy and its relationship to Aristotelianism.

=== Editorial work and academic service ===
Gutas has served on numerous editorial and advisory boards for major academic journals and series in philosophy, Islamic studies, and the history of science. These include Arabic Sciences and Philosophy (Cambridge University Press) and several Brill publications on Islamic intellectual history.

He has also contributed to large-scale collaborative projects such as Ueberweg’s History of Philosophy and The Classical Tradition.

== Honors and recognition ==
- World Prize for the Book of the Year of the Islamic Republic of Iran (2014)
- Corresponding Member, Academy of Athens (2014)
- Honorary Member, Science Academy of Turkey (Bilim Akademisi) (2014)
- Medal of the University of Bari, Italy (equivalent to an honorary degree) (2007)
- Fulbright Senior Scholar, Germany (1984–1985)
- Whitney Humanities Fellow, Yale University (1982–1984)
- Morse Fellow, Yale University (1981–1982)
- Carnegie Teaching Fellow, Yale College (1969–1970)
- Member of Phi Beta Kappa (1968)

== Publications ==
=== Monographs ===
- Greek Wisdom Literature in Arabic Translation. A Study of the Graeco-Arabic Gnomologia. (New Haven 1975)
- Avicenna and the Aristotelian tradition. Introduction to Reading Avicenna's Philosophical Works. (Leiden 1988; second revised and expanded edition 2014)
- Greek Thought, Arabic Culture. The Graeco-Arabic Translation Movement in Baghdad and Early 'Abbasid Society. (2nd-4th / 8th-10th centuries) (London and New York, 1998) (translated into seven languages)
- Greek Philosophers in the Arabic Tradition (Aldershot, Ashgate 2000)
- Philosophy, Theology and Mysticism in Medieval Islam, Dimitri Gutas & Richard M. Frank (London: Routledge, 2005)
- Orientations of Avicenna's Philosophy: Essays on his Life, Method, Heritage (Aldershot, Ashgate 2014)

=== Books edited ===
- Theophrastus of Eresus. Sources for his Life, Writings, Thought and Influence. 2 volumes edited by WW Fortenbaugh, PM Huby, RW Sharples, and D. Gutas (Leiden 1992)
- Theophrastus, On First Principles (transmitted as his Metaphysics). Greek text and Medieval Arabic translation, edited and translated, with Excursus on Graeco-Arabic Editorial Technique. Leiden 2010
- (With Gerhard Endress): A Greek and Arabic Lexicon (GALEX): Materials for a Dictionary of Medieval Translations from Greek into Arabic. Brill 1992 - (Handbook of Oriental Studies, Section One: The Near and Middle East, Vol 11)
- Aristotle Poetics / editio maior of the Greek text with historical introductions and philological commentaries by Leonardo Tarán (Greek and Latin, and edition of the Greek text) and Dimitri Gutas (Arabic and Syriac). Mnemosyne, bibliotheca classica Batava. Supplementum; v. 338. Leiden; Boston: Brill, 2012.

=== Articles ===
- The Study of Arabic Philosophy in the Twentieth Century. An Essay on the Historiography of Arabic Philosophy. In: British Journal of Middle Eastern Studies 29 (2002) 5–25
- The Heritage of Avicenna: The Golden Age of Arabic Philosophy, 1000 - 1350. In: J. Janssen, D. De Smet (eds.): Avicenna and His Heritage (Leuven 2002), 81–97.

=== Selections ===
- “The Empiricism of Avicenna,” Oriens 40 (2012) 391-436
- “Platon - Tradition Arabe,” Dictionnaire des Philosophes Antiques, vol. Va, 845- 863, Paris: CNRS, 2012
- "The Historical and Ideological Dimensions of Graeco-Arabic Studies: The Conquest of Knowledge from Alexander the Great to Meḥmed the Conqueror," Intellectual History of the Islamicate World 3 (2015) 326-350.
- “Philosophy and “Byzantine Philosophy” (with Niketas Siniossoglou),” in A. Kaldellis and N. Siniossoglou, eds., The Cambridge Intellectual History of Byzantium, Cambridge: CUP, 2017, 271-294.
- “Avicenna and After: The Development of Paraphilosophy. A History of Science Approach,” in Abdelkader Al Ghouz, ed., Islamic Philosophy from the 12th to the 14th Century, Göttingen: V&R unipress, 2018, 19-71.
