= Danishnama =

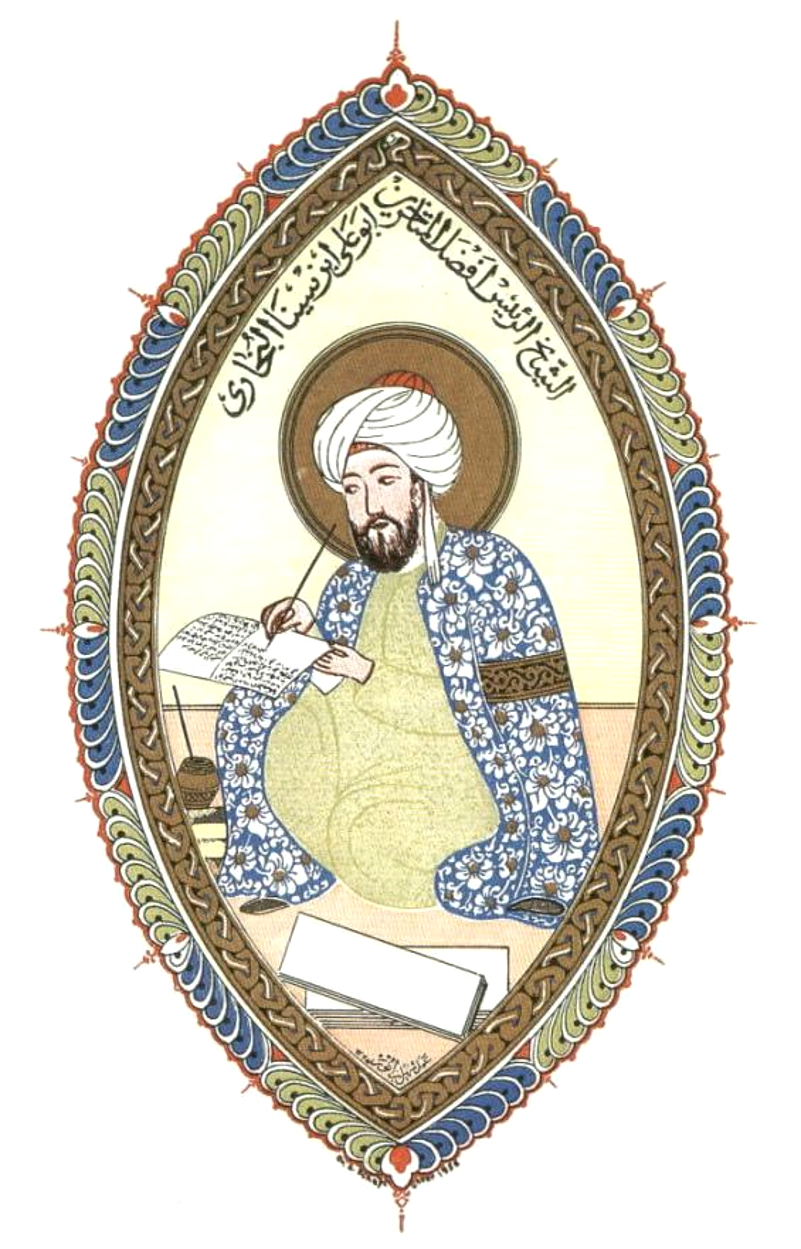
Ibn Sina (also known as Avicenna)

The Daneshnameh-ye Alai (Persian: دانشنامه علایی, romanized: Dānishnāma-yi ʻAlāʼī is an 11th-century Early New Persian work by Avicenna.

== Title ==
Ibn Sina dedicated the Danishnama or "Book of Science" to the Kakuyid ruler Ala al-Dawla Muhammad, who supported his work. The book is also known as the Ḥikmat-i ʿAlā'ī

== Topic ==
Daneshnameh-ye Alai is a comprehensive treatise on seven sciences grouped in four sections: logic, metaphysics, natural science and mathematics. The original section on mathematics was lost in Avicenna's lifetime.

== Translation ==
The Danishnama was translated into Arabic under the title Maqāṣad al-falāsafa by al-Ghazali in 1111, into French by M. Achena and H. Massé, under the title "Le livre de science", 2 vols., 1955–58 and into English by P. Morewedge, entitled The Metaphysica of Avicenna: A Critical Translation-Commentary and Analysis of the Fundamental Arguments in Avicenna’s Metaphysica in the Dānish Nāma-i ʿAlāʾī in 1973.
