= Avicenna International College =

- Avicenna Nemzetközi Kollégium
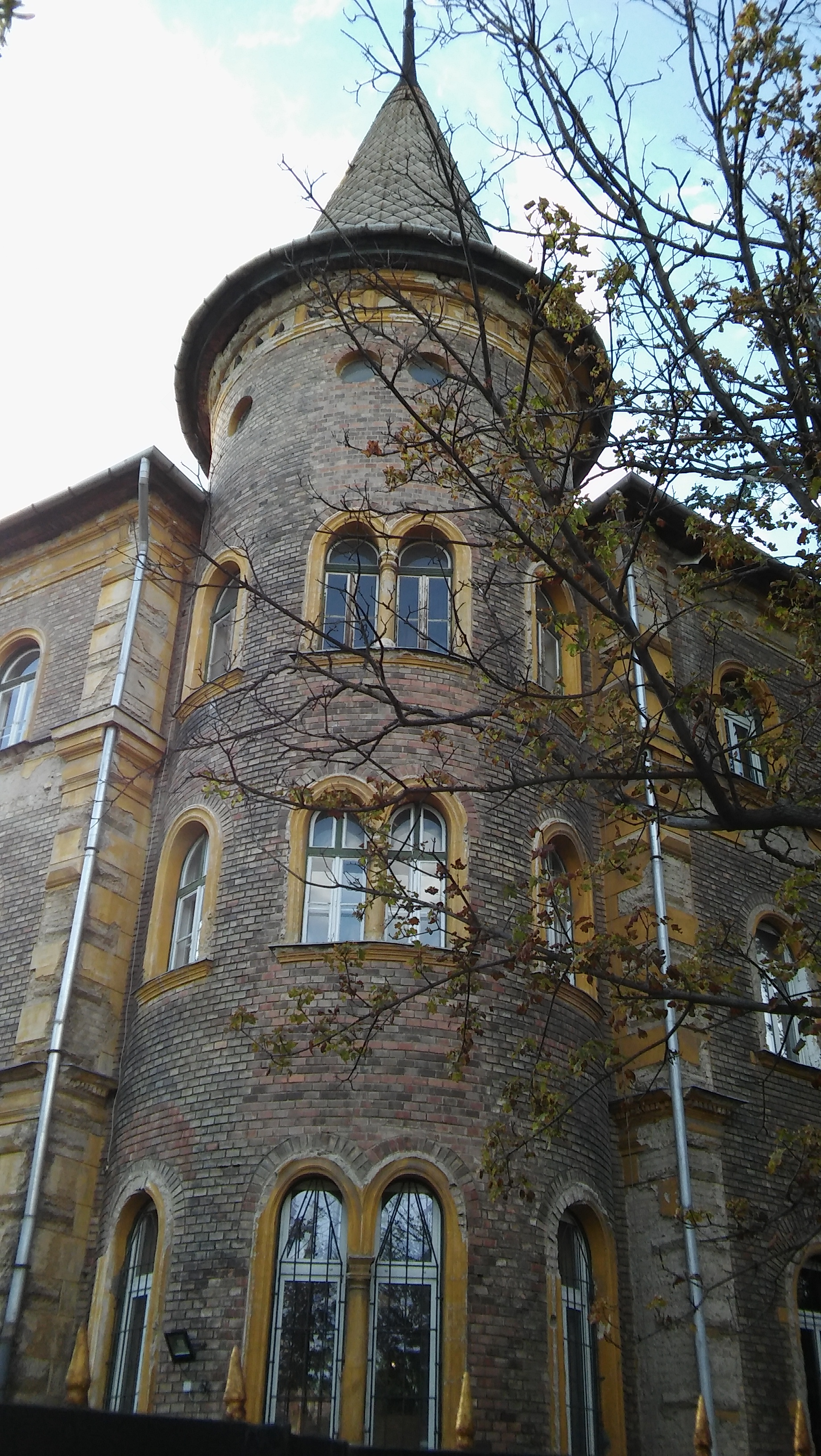
- Budapest; Hungary

Information
- Type: Preparatory college
- Established: 1995
- Founder: Shahrokh Mirza Hosseini
- Website: avicenna.hu

Avicenna International College (AIC) (Hungarian: Avicenna Nemzetközi Kollégium) was founded in 1995 by Shahrokh Mirza Hosseini and has been in operation as a preparatory college for higher education since 2000. It offers foundation programs in medicine, business, technical studies, and English, as well as preparatory programs for Masters and PhD studies.

== History ==
The predecessor to Avicenna International College was founded in 1995, and the college launched its first academic year in 2000. Since then, more than 3,000 students have successfully completed one of the institution’s preparatory programs.

In 2003, AIC established its international advisory board, which supervises and supports the college's educational activities and programs.

In 2004, AIC opened the Avicenna Residential Complex for the college's growing international student population.

In 2006, AIC started a scholarship program to give aid to students who have financial problems.
