= Avicenna Mausoleum =

Monument in Hamadan, Iran

- آرامگاه بوعلی‌سینا
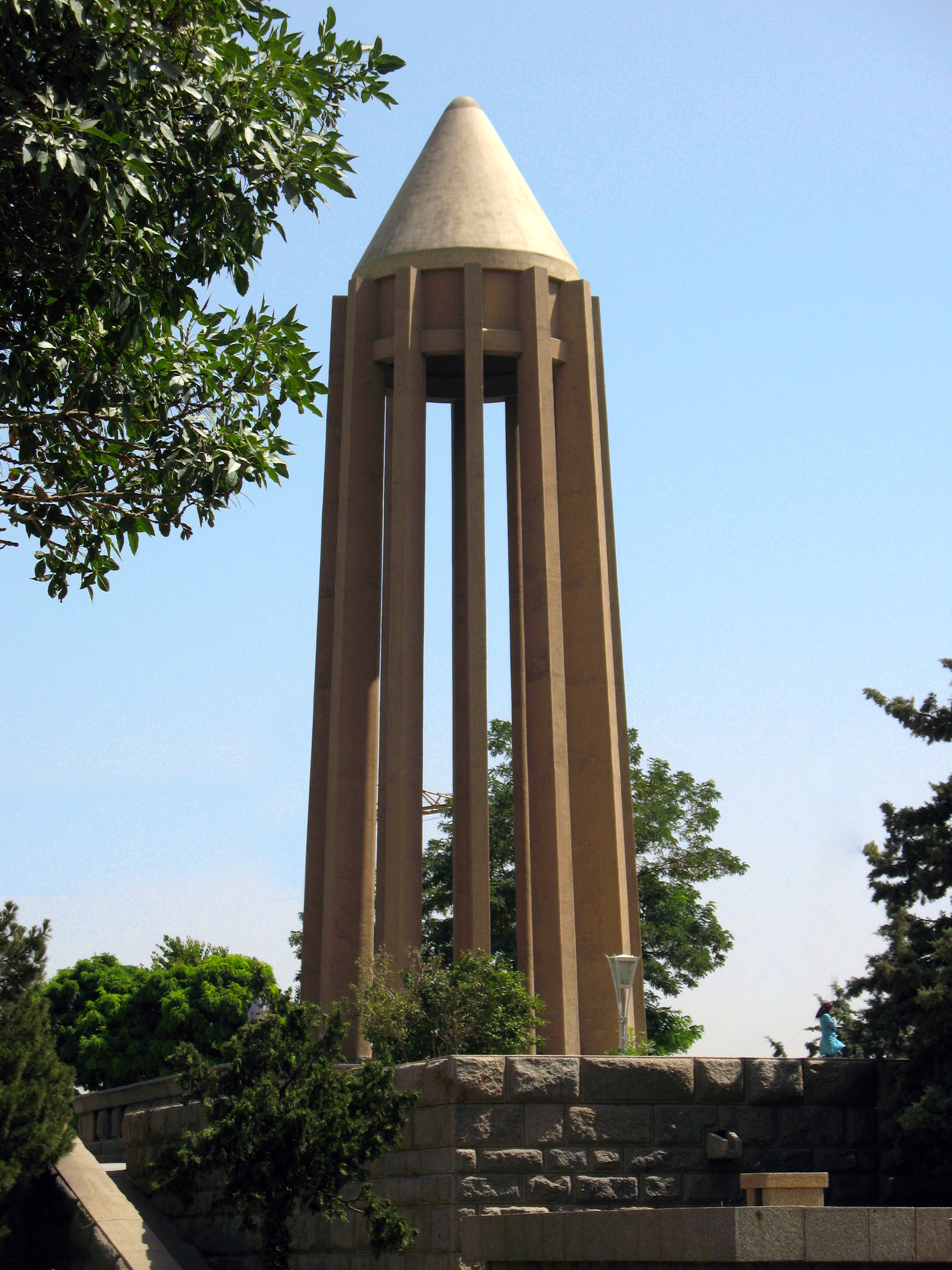
- Mausoleum of Avicenna

- Location of the mausoleum in Iran

Religion
- Affiliation: Islam
- Ecclesiastical or organizational status: Mausoleum and; history museum
- Status: Active
- Dedication: Avicenna

Location
- Location: Avicenna Square, Hamadan, Hamadan province
- Country: Iran
- Interactive map of Avicenna Mausoleum
- Coordinates: 34°47′30″N 48°30′48″E

Architecture
- Architect: Hooshang Seyhoun
- Type: Islamic architecture
- Style: Qajr; Pahlavi
- Funded by: Iranian Monuments Society (1953)
- General contractor: Ebtehaj and partners Co.
- Groundbreaking: 6 June 1949 (mausoleum complex)
- Completed: Qajar era (tomb); 1953 (mausoleum complex)

Specifications
- Interior area: 3,090 m^{2} (33,300 sq ft)
- Spire: One: (tower)
- Spire height: 28 m (92 ft)
- Monuments: Two: Avicenna and Abu Saied
- Materials: Reinforced concrete; granite
- Elevation: 1,843 m (6,047 ft)
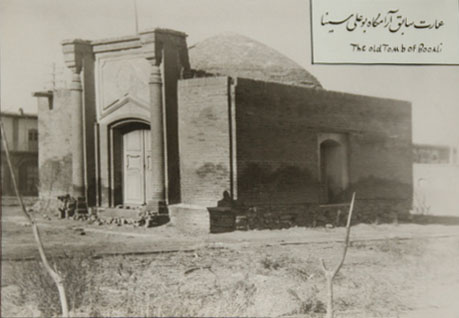
- An earlier structure in the 1950s, before being rebuilt

Iran National Heritage List
- Official name: Mausoleum of Avicenna
- Type: Built
- Designated: 11 May 1997
- Reference no.: 1869
- Conservation organization: Cultural Heritage, Handicrafts and Tourism Organization of Iran

The Mausoleum of Avicenna (Persian: آرامگاه بوعلی‌سینا, lit. 'Ibn Sina Mausoleum'; Arabic: ضريح ابن سين), also known as the Tomb of Abu Ali Sina, is a mausoleum and history museum complex, located at Avicenna Square, in the city of Hamadan, in the province of Hamadan, Iran. Dedicated to the Persian polymath Avicenna, the complex includes a library, a small museum, and a spindle-shaped 28-metre-high (92 ft) tower inspired by the Ziyarid-era Kavus Tower.

The mausoleum and museum complex was added to the Iran National Heritage List on 11 May 1997 and is administered by the Cultural Heritage, Handicrafts and Tourism Organization of Iran.

== History ==
The primary building of the mausoleum was built in the Qajar era.

The Pahlavi government had plans to build the mausoleum since at least 1939. Houshang Seyhoun won competitions for the mausoleums of Ferdowsi and Avicenna before heading to France. He completed his training at the Ecole des Beaux-Arts in 1948 with the project "Le mausolée d'Avicenne à Hamadan." The mausoleum was eventually dedicated in a grand ceremony in May 1954, on the occasion of the philosopher's millennial birth anniversary, and the avenue running in front of it was also renamed in honor of Avicenna.

As the monument was constructed by the Pahlavi government, it was consequently in danger of being defaced, but as Khomeini was an admirer of Avicenna, the square was not renamed after the 1979 Revolution.

The museum contains ancient relics, bronze statues related to the 1st millennium BCE, gourds, coins, beads, and articles of silver related to the Sassanide era. The library contains an anthropology section, and books of Avicenna.

== Gallery ==
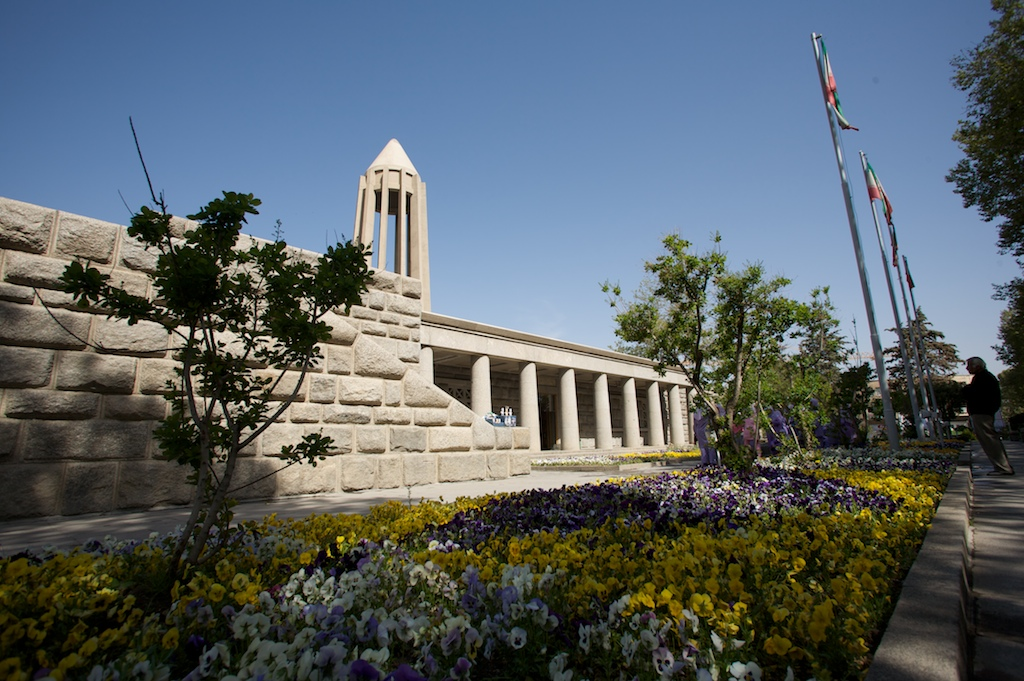
Mausoleum of Avicenna

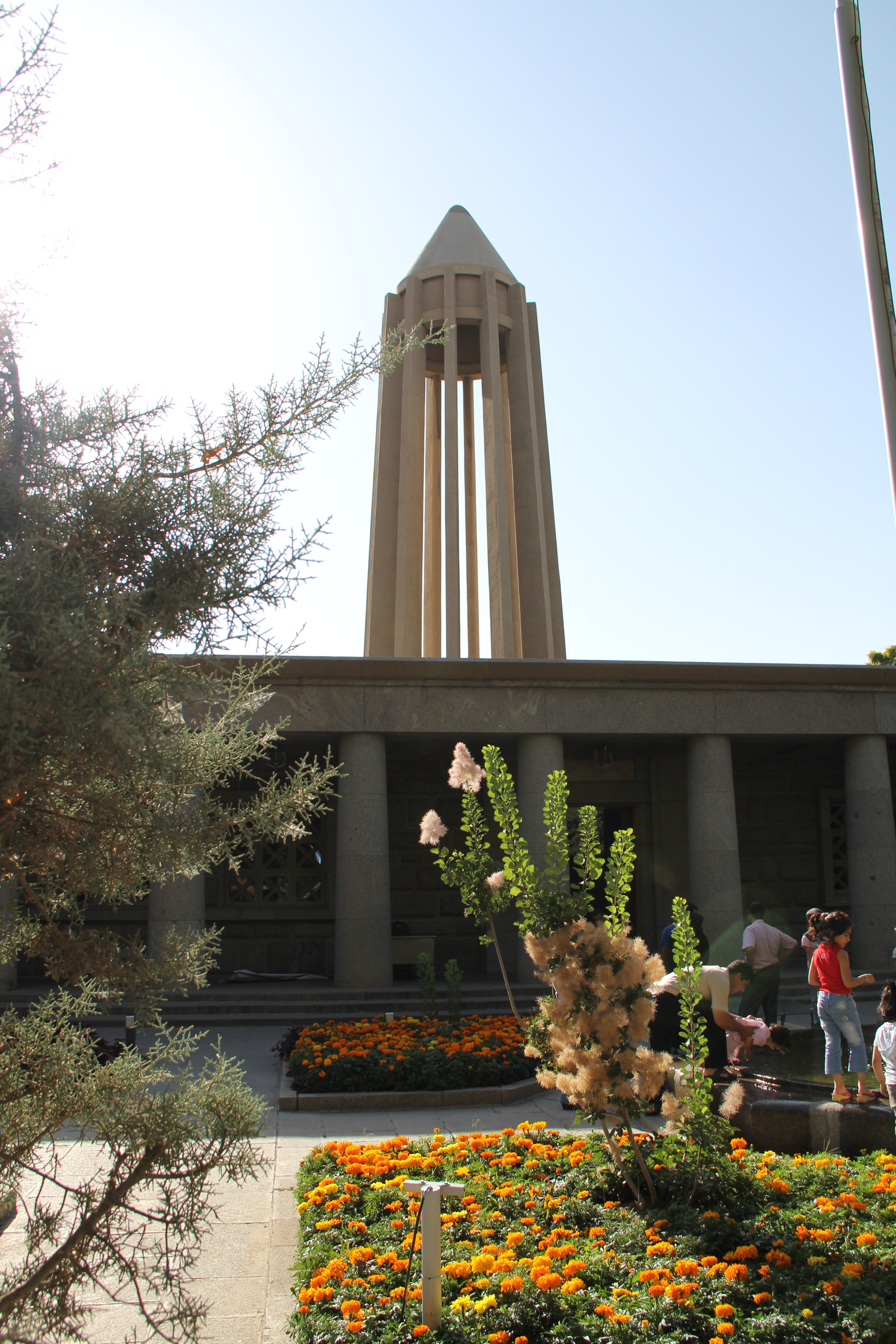
Mausoleum of Avicenna

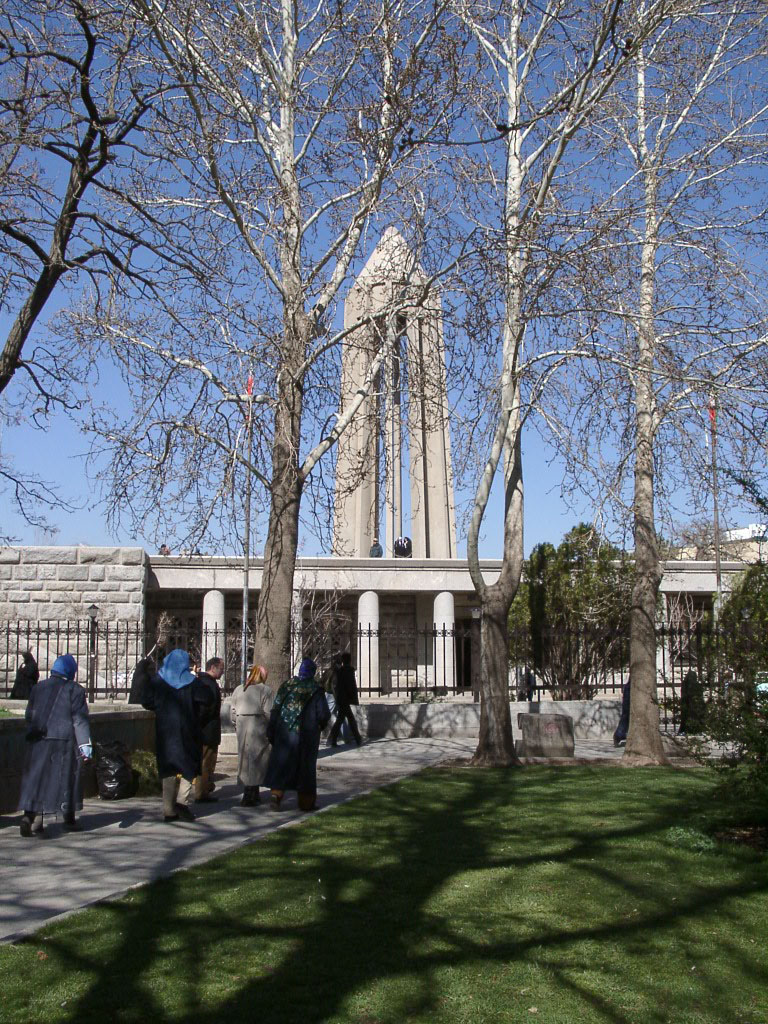
Outside view

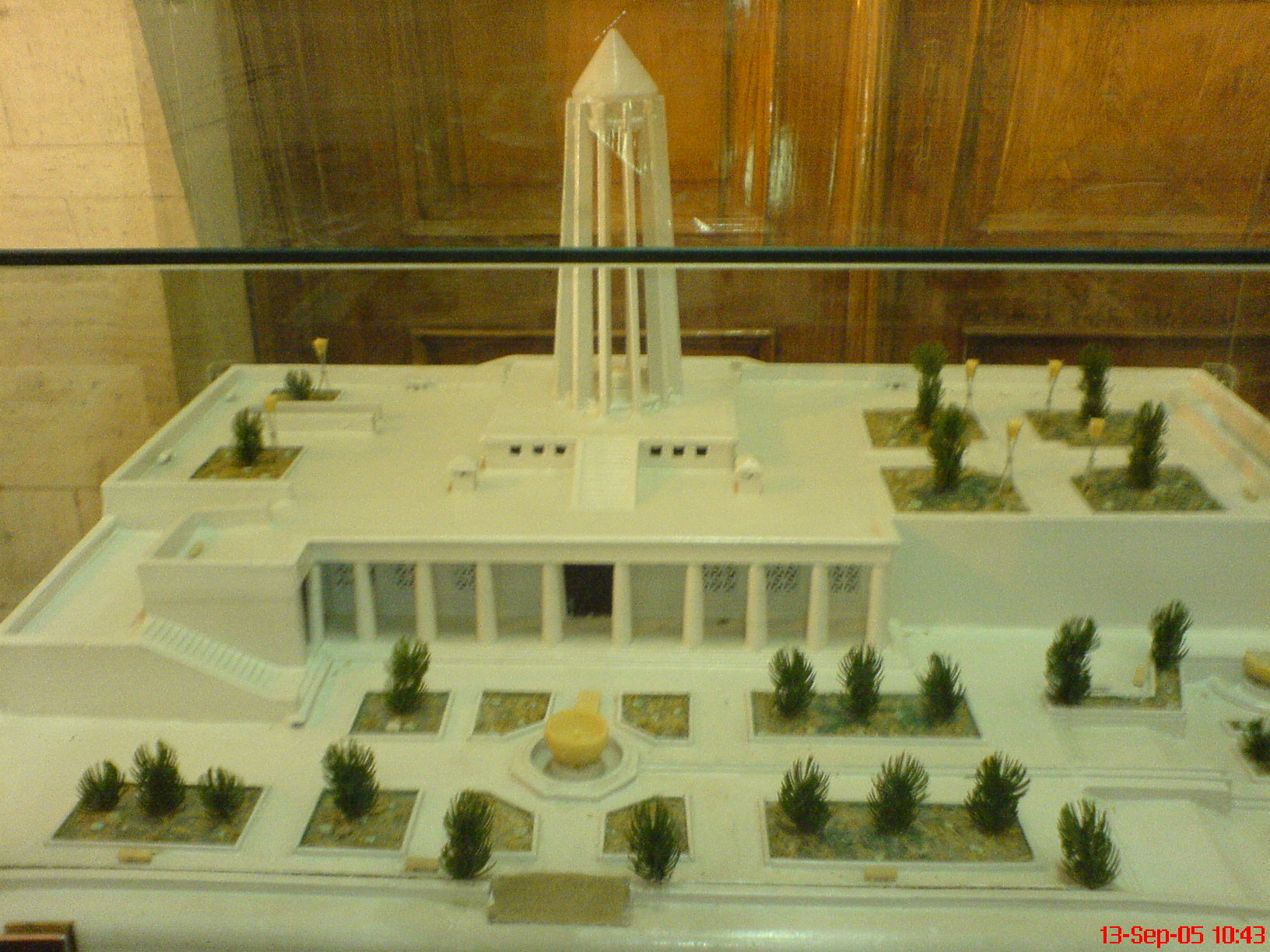
A model of the complex

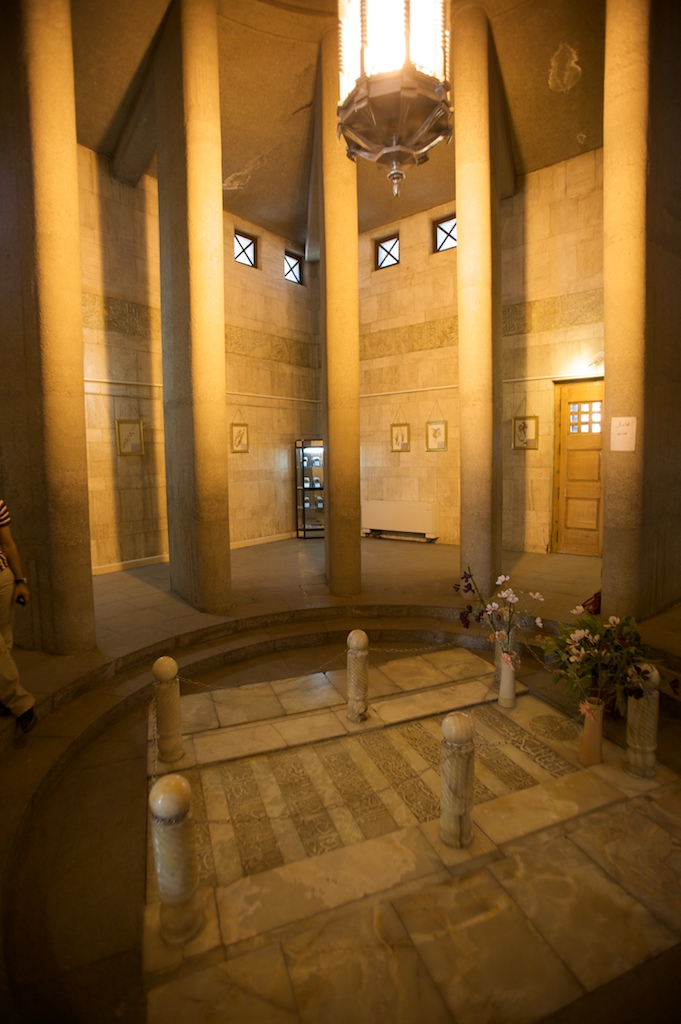
An interior view

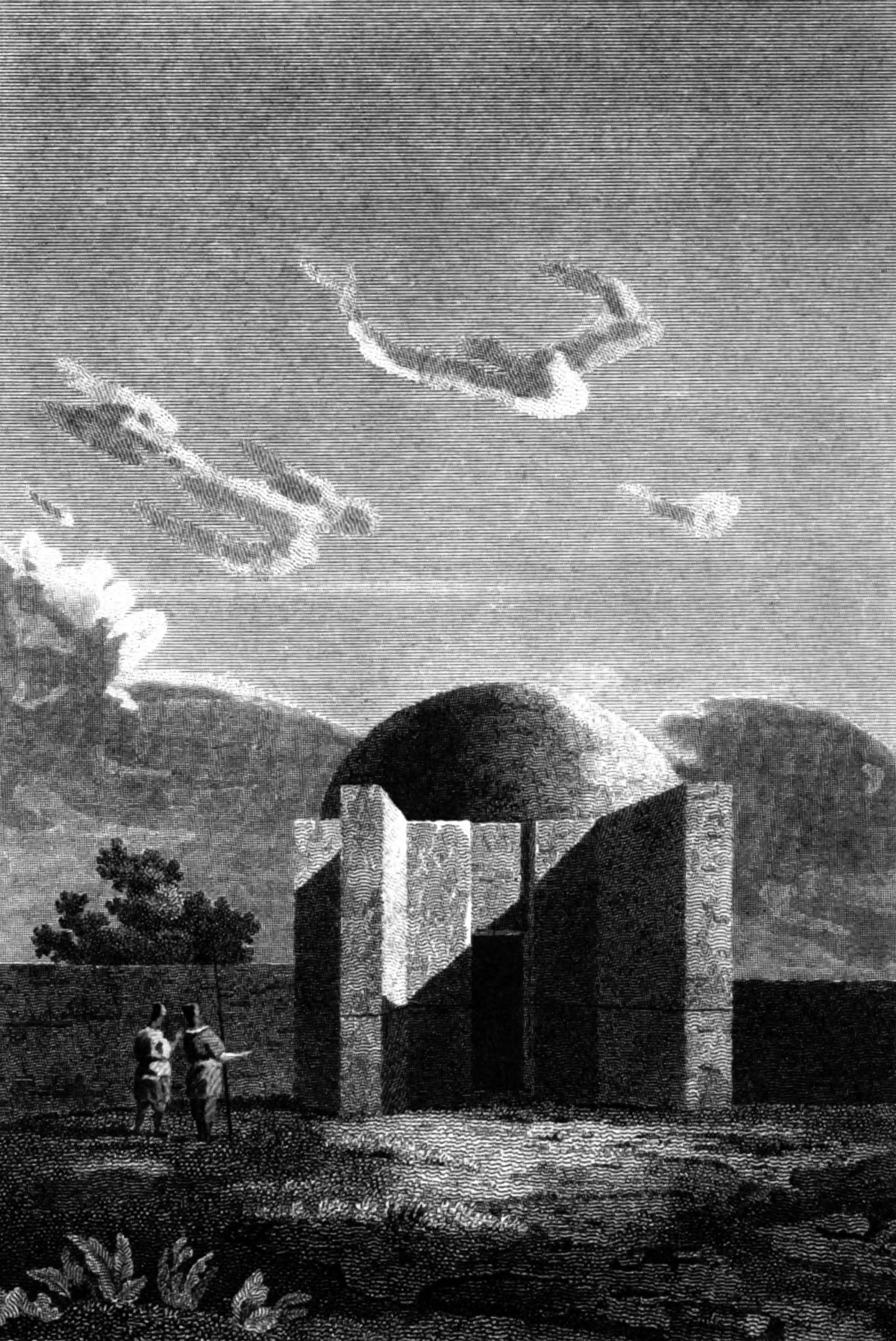
The old mausoleum drawn by Charles Heath

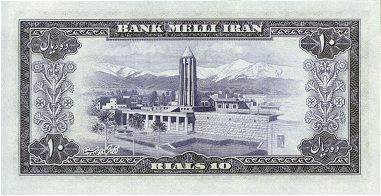
Avicenna Mausoleum on the reverse of a 1954 10 Iranian rial banknote

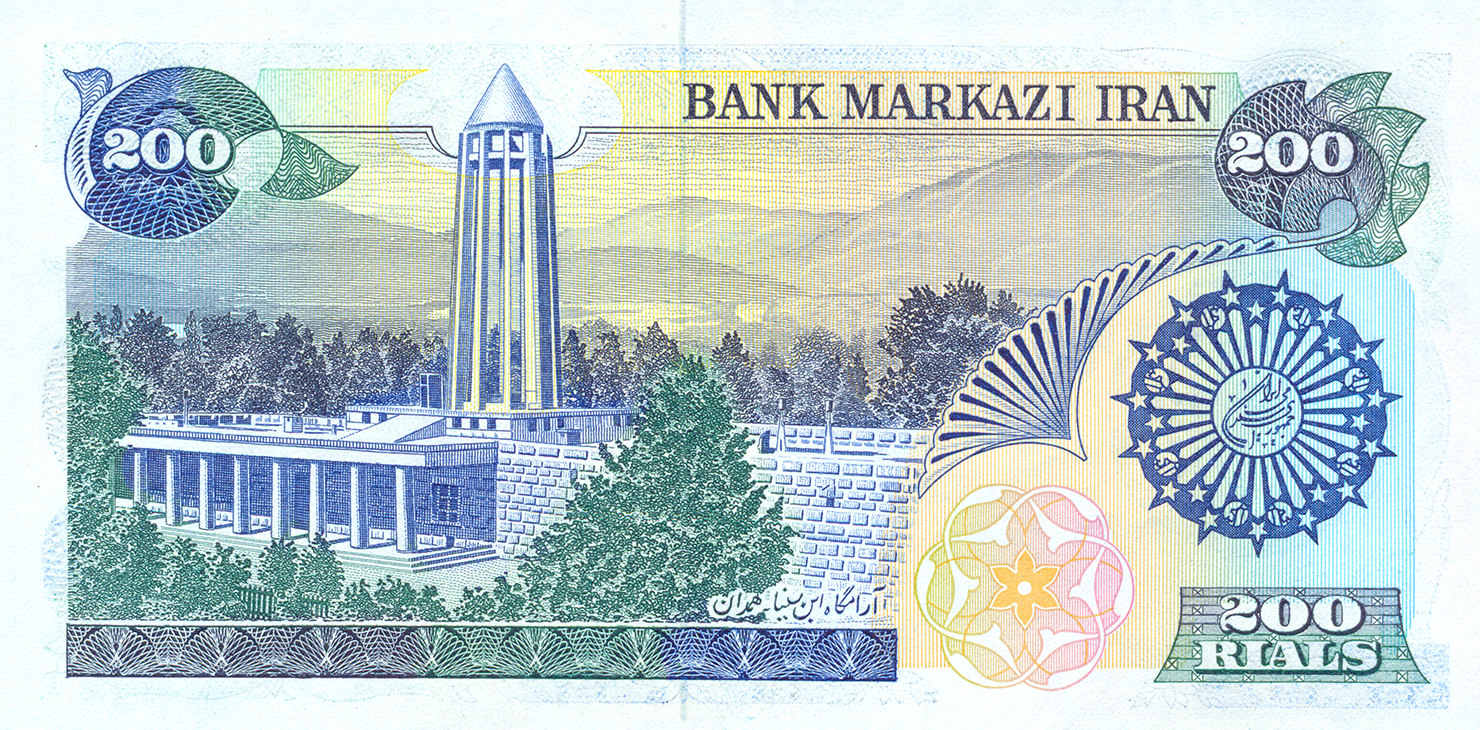
Avicenna Mausoleum on the reverse of a 1981 200 Iranian rial banknote

== See also ==
- Islam in Iran
- List of mausoleums in Iran
- Museums in Iran
