= Bekker numbering =

Standard form of referencing to works in the Corpus Aristotelicum

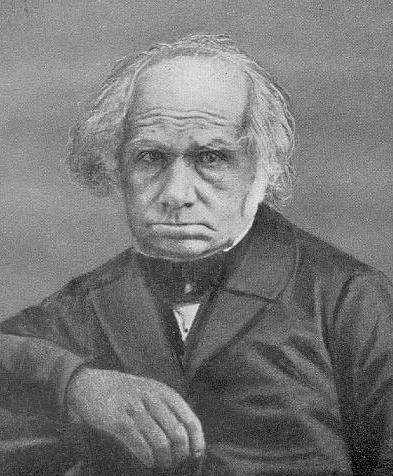
August Immanuel Bekker

Bekker numbering or Bekker pagination is the standard form of citation to the works of Aristotle. It is based on the page numbers used in the Prussian Academy of Sciences edition of the complete works of Aristotle (1831–1837) and takes its name from the editor of that edition, the classical philologist August Immanuel Bekker (1785–1871); because the academy was located in Berlin, Prussia, the system is occasionally referred to by the alternative name Berlin numbering or Berlin pagination.

Bekker numbers consist of up to three ordered coordinates, or pieces of information: a number, the letter a or b, and another number, which refer respectively to the page number of Bekker's edition of the Greek text of Aristotle's works, the page column (a standard page of Bekker's edition has exactly two columns), and the line number (total lines typically ranging from 20 to 40 on a given column or page in Bekker's edition). For example, the Bekker number denoting the beginning of Aristotle's Nicomachean Ethics is 1094a1, which corresponds to page 1094 of Bekker's edition, first column (column a), line 1.

All modern editions or translations of Aristotle intended for scholarly readers use Bekker numbers, in addition to or instead of page numbers. Contemporary scholars writing on Aristotle use the Bekker number so that the author's citations can be checked by readers without having to use the same edition or translation that the author used.

While Bekker numbers are the dominant method used to refer to the works of Aristotle, Catholic or Thomist scholars often use the medieval method of reference by book, chapter, and sentence, albeit generally in addition to Bekker numbers.

Stephanus pagination is the comparable system for referring to the works of Plato, and Diels–Kranz numbering is the comparable system for Pre-Socratic philosophy. Unlike Stephanus pagination, which is based upon a three-volume translation of Plato's works and which recycles low page numbers across the three volumes, introducing the possibility for ambiguity if the Platonic work or volume is not specified, Bekker page numbers cycle from 1 through the end of the Corpus Aristotelicum regardless of volume, without starting over for some other given volume. Bekker numbering therefore has the advantage that its notation is unambiguous as compact numerical information, although it relies upon the ordering of Aristotle's works as presented in Bekker's edition.

== Aristotle's works by Bekker numbers ==
The following list is complete. The titles are given in accordance with the standard set by the Revised Oxford Translation. Latin titles, still often used by scholars, are also given.

Key: * / Authenticity disputed.; [ ] / Generally agreed to be spurious.
Bekker number	Work	Latin name
Logic
	Organon
1a	Categories	Categoriae
16a	On Interpretation	De Interpretatione
24a	Prior Analytics	Analytica Priora
71a	Posterior Analytics	Analytica Posteriora
100a	Topics	Topica
164a	On Sophistical Refutations	De Sophisticis Elenchis
Physics (natural philosophy)
184a	Physics	Physica
268a	On the Heavens	De Caelo
314a	On Generation and Corruption	De Generatione et Corruptione
338a	Meteorology	Meteorologica
391a	[On the Universe]	[De Mundo]
402a	On the Soul	De Anima
	Parva Naturalia ("Short Works on Nature")
436a	Sense and Sensibilia	De Sensu et Sensibilibus
449b	On Memory	De Memoria et Reminiscentia
453b	On Sleep	De Somno et Vigilia
458a	On Dreams	De Insomniis
462b	On Divination in Sleep	De Divinatione per Somnum
464b	On Length and Shortness of Life	De Longitudine et Brevitate Vitae
467b	On Youth, Old Age, Life and Death, and Respiration	De Juventute et Senectute, De; Vita et Morte, De Respiratione
481a	[On Breath]	[De Spiritu]
486a	History of Animals	Historia Animalium
639a	Parts of Animals	De Partibus Animalium
698a	Movement of Animals	De Motu Animalium
704a	Progression of Animals	De Incessu Animalium
715a	Generation of Animals	De Generatione Animalium
791a	[On Colors]	[De Coloribus]
800a	[On Things Heard]	[De audibilibus]
805a	[Physiognomonics]	[Physiognomonica]
815a	[On Plants]	[De Plantis]
830a	[On Marvellous Things Heard]	[De mirabilibus auscultationibus]
847a	[Mechanics]	[Mechanica]
859a	Problems*	Problemata*
968a	[On Indivisible Lines]	[De Lineis Insecabilibus]
973a	[The Situations and Names of Winds]	[Ventorum Situs]
974a	[On Melissus, Xenophanes, and Gorgias]	[De Melisso, Xenophane, Gorgia]
Metaphysics
980a	Metaphysics	Metaphysica
Ethics and politics
1094a	Nicomachean Ethics	Ethica Nicomachea
1181a	Great Ethics*	Magna Moralia*
1214a	Eudemian Ethics	Ethica Eudemia
1249a	[On Virtues and Vices]	[De Virtutibus et Vitiis Libellus]
1252a	Politics	Politica
1343a	Economics*	Oeconomica*
Rhetoric and poetics
1354a	Rhetoric	Ars Rhetorica
1420a	[Rhetoric to Alexander]	[Rhetorica ad Alexandrum]
1447a	Poetics	Ars Poetica

== Aristotelian works lacking Bekker numbers ==
=== Constitution of the Athenians ===
The Constitution of the Athenians (or Athenaiōn Politeia) was not included in Bekker's edition because it was first edited in 1891 from papyrus rolls acquired in 1890 by the British Museum. The standard reference to it is by section (and subsection) numbers.

=== Fragments ===
Surviving fragments of the many lost works of Aristotle were included in the fifth volume of Bekker's edition, edited by Valentin Rose. These are not cited by Bekker numbers, however, but according to fragment numbers. Rose's first edition of the fragments of Aristotle was Aristoteles Pseudepigraphus (1863). As the title suggests, Rose considered these all to be spurious. The numeration of the fragments in a revised edition by Rose, published in the Teubner series, Aristotelis qui ferebantur librorum fragmenta, Leipzig, 1886, is still commonly used (indicated by R^{3}), although there is a more current edition with a different numeration by Olof Gigon (published in 1987 as a new vol. 3 in Walter de Gruyter's reprint of the Bekker edition), and a new de Gruyter edition by Eckart Schütrumpf is in preparation.

For a selection of the fragments in English translation, see W.D. Ross, Select Fragments (Oxford 1952), and Jonathan Barnes (ed.), The Complete Works of Aristotle: The Revised Oxford Translation, vol. 2, Princeton 1984, pp. 2384–2465.

The works surviving only in fragments include the dialogues On Philosophy (or On the Good), Eudemus (or On the Soul), On Justice, and On Good Birth. The possibly spurious work, On Ideas survives in quotations by Alexander of Aphrodisias in his commentary on Aristotle's Metaphysics. For the dialogues, see also the editions of Richard Rudolf Walzer, Aristotelis Dialogorum fragmenta, in usum scholarum (Florence 1934), and Renato Laurenti, Aristotele: I frammenti dei dialoghi (2 vols.), Naples: Luigi Loffredo, 1987.

== Use in citations ==
To cite a work of the Corpus Aristotelicum or part thereof, Bekker numbers may be combined with book, chapter, and line numbers to give a precise reference. By academic convention, and regardless of the citation style otherwise generally followed throughout an academic work, the pagination in a citation to Aristotle would be in the general form of: Book number(s).Chapter number(s),Bekker number(s)Line number(s).

For example, a citation of (Metaphysics, 1.9, 991b9-20) would refer to lines 9–20 on page 991b of chapter 9 in Book I of the Metaphysics.

== See also ==
- Stephanus pagination
- Diels–Kranz numbering
