= Works of Aristotle =

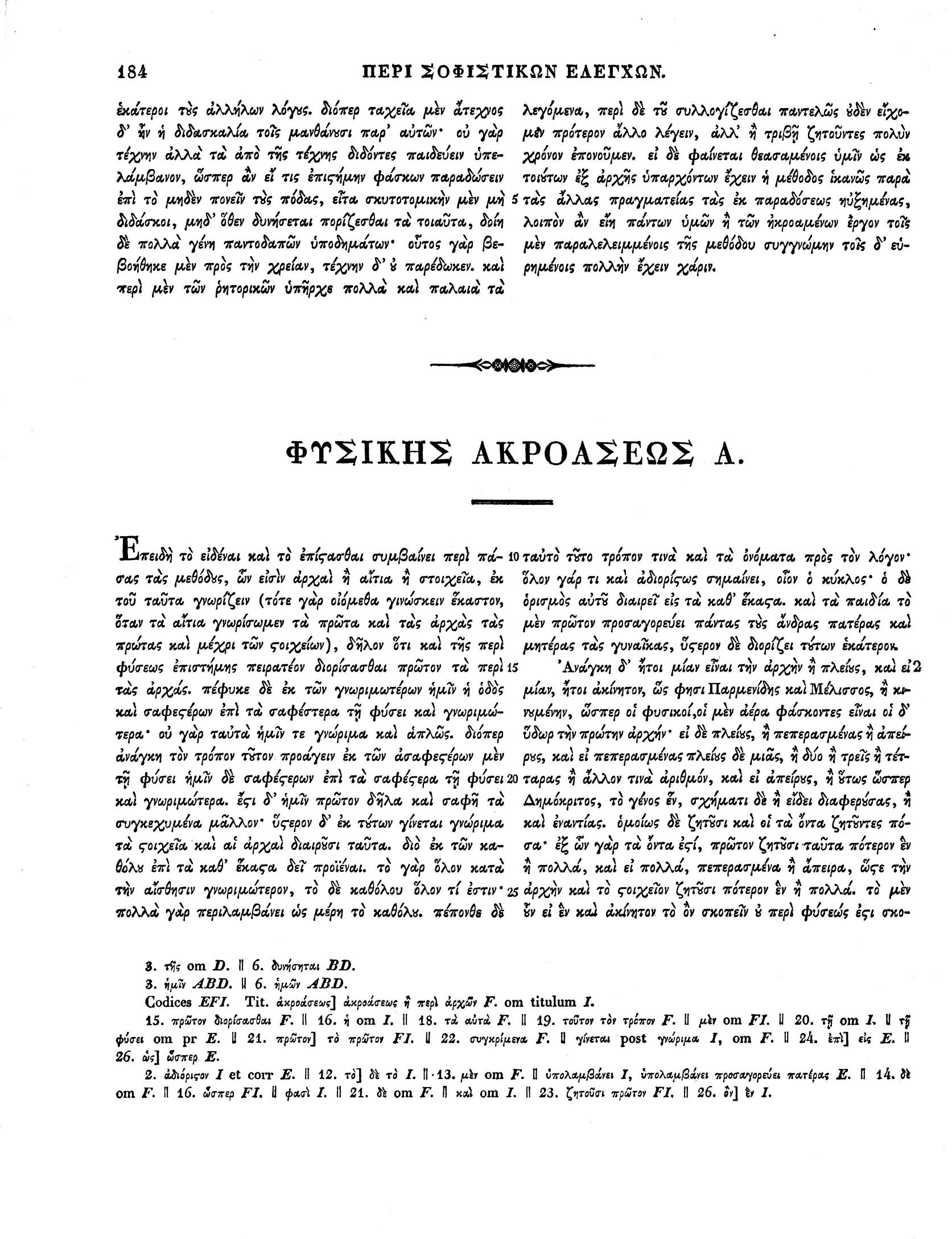
The end of Sophistical Refutations and beginning of Physics on page 184 of Bekker's 1831 edition.

The Corpus Aristotelicum is the collection of Aristotle's works that have survived from antiquity through medieval manuscript transmission.

According to a distinction that originates with Aristotle himself, his writings are divisible into two groups: the "exoteric" and the "esoteric". Most scholars have understood this as a distinction between works Aristotle intended for the public (exoteric), and the more technical works intended for use within the Lyceum (esoteric). Modern scholars commonly assume these latter to be Aristotle's own (unpolished) lecture notes (or in some cases possible notes by his students). However, one classic scholar offers an alternative interpretation. The 5th century neoplatonist Ammonius Hermiae writes that Aristotle's writing style is deliberately obscurantist so that "good people may for that reason stretch their mind even more, whereas empty minds that are lost through carelessness will be put to flight by the obscurity when they encounter sentences like these".

Not all of these works are considered genuine, but differ with respect to their connection to Aristotle, his associates and his views. Some are regarded by most scholars as products of Aristotle's "school" and compiled under his direction or supervision. Other works, such as On Colors, may have been products of Aristotle's successors at the Lyceum, e.g., Theophrastus and Strato of Lampsacus. Still others acquired Aristotle's name through similarities in doctrine or content, such as De Plantis, possibly by Nicolaus of Damascus. A final category, omitted here, includes medieval palmistries, astrological and magical texts whose connection to Aristotle is purely fanciful and self-promotional.

In several of the treatises, there are references to other works in the corpus. Based on such references, some scholars have suggested a possible chronological order for a number of Aristotle's writings. W. D. Ross, for instance, suggested the following broad chronology (which of course leaves out much): Categories, Topics, Sophistici Elenchi, Analytics, Metaphysics Δ, the physical works, the Ethics, and the rest of the Metaphysics. Many modern scholars, however, based simply on lack of evidence, are skeptical of such attempts to determine the chronological order of Aristotle's writings.

== History of the works ==
According to Strabo and Plutarch, after Aristotle's death, his library of writings went to Theophrastus (Aristotle's successor as head of the Lyceum and the Peripatetic school). After the death of Theophrastus, the peripatetic library went to Neleus of Scepsis.

Some time later, the Kingdom of Pergamon began conscripting books for a royal library, and the heirs of Neleus hid their collection in a cellar to prevent it from being seized for that purpose. The library was stored there for about a century and a half, in conditions that were not ideal for document preservation. On the death of Attalus III, which also ended the royal library ambitions, the existence of the Aristotelian library was disclosed, and it was purchased by Apellicon and returned to Athens in about 100 BCE.

Apellicon sought to recover the texts, many of which were seriously degraded at this point due to the conditions in which they were stored. He had them copied out into new manuscripts, and used his best guesswork to fill in the gaps where the originals were unreadable.

When Sulla seized Athens in 86 BCE, he seized the library and transferred it to Rome. There, Andronicus of Rhodes organized the texts into the first complete edition of Aristotle's works (and works attributed to him). The Aristotelian texts we have today are based on these.

Diogenes Laërtius lists, in his Lives and Opinions of Eminent Philosophers (c. 230 CE), works of Aristotle comprising 156 titles divided into approximately 400 books, which he reports as totaling 445,270 lines of writing; however, many of these are lost or only survive in fragments, and some may have been incorrectly attributed.

== Aristotle's works by Bekker numbers ==
Bekker numbers, the standard form of reference to works in the Corpus Aristotelicum, are based on the page numbers used in the Prussian Academy of Sciences edition of the complete works of Aristotle (Aristotelis Opera edidit Academia Regia Borussica, Berlin, 1831–1870). They take their name from the editor of that edition, the classical philologist August Immanuel Bekker (1785–1871).

Key: * / Authenticity disputed.; [ ] / Generally agreed to be spurious.
Bekker number	Work	Latin name
Logic
	Organon
1a	Categories	Categoriae
16a	On Interpretation	De Interpretatione
24a	Prior Analytics	Analytica Priora
71a	Posterior Analytics	Analytica Posteriora
100a	Topics	Topica
164a	On Sophistical Refutations	De Sophisticis Elenchis
Physics (natural philosophy)
184a	Physics	Physica
268a	On the Heavens	De Caelo
314a	On Generation and Corruption	De Generatione et Corruptione
338a	Meteorology	Meteorologica
391a	[On the Universe]	[De Mundo]
402a	On the Soul	De Anima
	Parva Naturalia ("Short Works on Nature")
436a	Sense and Sensibilia	De Sensu et Sensibilibus
449b	On Memory	De Memoria et Reminiscentia
453b	On Sleep	De Somno et Vigilia
458a	On Dreams	De Insomniis
462b	On Divination in Sleep	De Divinatione per Somnum
464b	On Length and Shortness of Life	De Longitudine et Brevitate Vitae
467b	On Youth, Old Age, Life and Death, and Respiration	De Juventute et Senectute, De; Vita et Morte, De Respiratione
481a	[On Breath]	[De Spiritu]
486a	History of Animals	Historia Animalium
639a	Parts of Animals	De Partibus Animalium
698a	Movement of Animals	De Motu Animalium
704a	Progression of Animals	De Incessu Animalium
715a	Generation of Animals	De Generatione Animalium
791a	[On Colors]	[De Coloribus]
800a	[On Things Heard]	[De audibilibus]
805a	[Physiognomonics]	[Physiognomonica]
815a	[On Plants]	[De Plantis]
830a	[On Marvellous Things Heard]	[De mirabilibus auscultationibus]
847a	[Mechanics]	[Mechanica]
859a	Problems*	Problemata*
968a	[On Indivisible Lines]	[De Lineis Insecabilibus]
973a	[The Situations and Names of Winds]	[Ventorum Situs]
974a	[On Melissus, Xenophanes, and Gorgias]	[De Melisso, Xenophane, Gorgia]
Metaphysics
980a	Metaphysics	Metaphysica
Ethics and politics
1094a	Nicomachean Ethics	Ethica Nicomachea
1181a	Great Ethics*	Magna Moralia*
1214a	Eudemian Ethics	Ethica Eudemia
1249a	[On Virtues and Vices]	[De Virtutibus et Vitiis Libellus]
1252a	Politics	Politica
1343a	Economics*	Oeconomica*
Rhetoric and poetics
1354a	Rhetoric	Ars Rhetorica
1420a	[Rhetoric to Alexander]	[Rhetorica ad Alexandrum]
1447a	Poetics	Ars Poetica

=== Fragments ===
Surviving fragments of the many lost works of Aristotle were included in the fifth volume of Bekker's edition, edited by Valentin Rose. These are not cited by Bekker numbers, however, but according to fragment numbers. Rose's first edition of the fragments of Aristotle was Aristoteles Pseudepigraphus (1863). As the title suggests, Rose considered these all to be spurious. The numeration of the fragments in a revised edition by Rose, published in the Teubner series, Aristotelis qui ferebantur librorum fragmenta, Leipzig, 1886, is still commonly used (indicated by R^{3}), although there is a more current edition with a different numeration by Olof Gigon (published in 1987 as a new vol. 3 in Walter de Gruyter's reprint of the Bekker edition), and a new de Gruyter edition by Eckart Schütrumpf is in preparation.

For a selection of the fragments in English translation, see W. D. Ross, Select Fragments (Oxford 1952), and Jonathan Barnes (ed.), The Complete Works of Aristotle: The Revised Oxford Translation, vol. 2, Princeton 1984, pp. 2384–2465. A new translation exists of the fragments of Aristotle's Protrepticus, by Hutchinson and Johnson (2015).

The works surviving only in fragments include the dialogues On Philosophy (or On the Good), Eudemus (or On the Soul), On Justice, and On Good Birth. The possibly spurious work, On Ideas survives in quotations by Alexander of Aphrodisias in his commentary on Aristotle's Metaphysics. For the dialogues, see also the editions of Richard Rudolf Walzer, Aristotelis Dialogorum fragmenta, in usum scholarum (Florence 1934), and Renato Laurenti, Aristotele: I frammenti dei dialoghi (2 vols.), Naples: Luigi Loffredo, 1987. Additionally, the Constitution of the Athenians (Greek, Athenaiōn Politeia; Latin, Atheniensium Respublica) was not included in Bekker's edition because it was first discovered in 1879.

=== Printed editions ===
Aristotle's works have been published in many printed editions, either as complete editions of all surviving writings or as partial collections. English complete editions include:

- W. D. Ross translation, 12 vols. (Oxford University Press, 1955)
- Jonathan Barnes translation, 2 vols., 1984

== Sources ==
Works cited

- Barnes, Jonathan (1995). "Life and Work". The Cambridge Companion to Aristotle.
- Lynch, John Patrick (1972). Aristotle's School: a Study of a Greek Educational Institution. University of California Press.
- Novak, Joseph A. (2001). "Abduction and Aristotle's Library" (PDF). Scholarship at Uwindsor.
- Watson, Walter (2012). The Lost Second Book of Aristotle's Poetics. University of Chicago Press. ISBN 9780226875101.
