= Aristotle's biology =

Aristotle's theories of biology

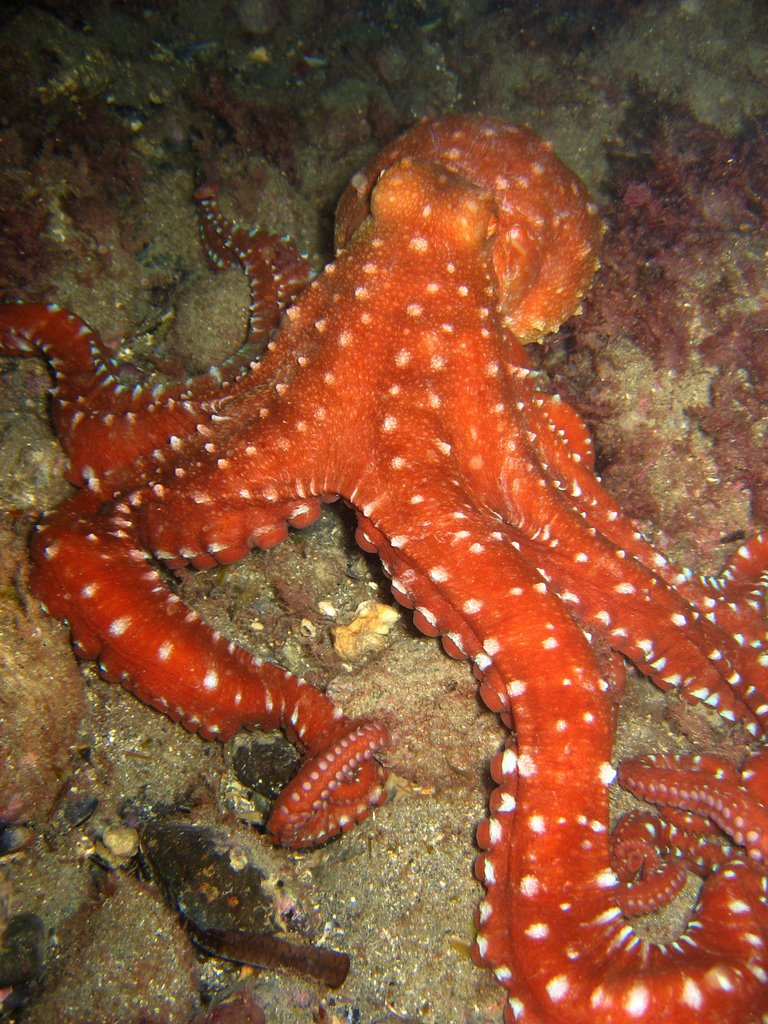
Among Aristotle's many observations of marine biology was that the octopus can change colour when disturbed.

Aristotle's biology is the theory of biology, grounded in systematic observation and collection of data, mainly zoological, embodied in Aristotle's books on the science. Many of his observations were made during his stay on the island of Lesbos, including especially his descriptions of the marine biology of the Pyrrha lagoon, now the Gulf of Kalloni. His theory is based on his concept of form, which derives from but is markedly unlike Plato's theory of Forms.

The theory describes five major biological processes, namely metabolism, temperature regulation, information processing, embryogenesis, and inheritance. Each was defined in detail, in some cases enough allowing modern biologists to construct mathematical models of the mechanisms described. Aristotle's method, too, resembled the style of science used by modern biologists when exploring a new area, with systematic data collection, discovery of patterns, and inference of possible causal explanations from these. He did not perform experiments in the modern sense, but made observations of living animals and carried out dissections. He names some 500 species of bird, mammal, and fish; and he distinguishes dozens of insects and other invertebrates. He describes the internal anatomy of over a hundred animals, and dissected around 35 of these.

Aristotle's writings on biology, the first in the history of science, are scattered across several books, forming about a quarter of his writings that have survived. The main biology texts were the History of Animals, Generation of Animals, Movement of Animals, Progression of Animals, Parts of Animals, and On the Soul, as well as the lost drawings of The Anatomies which accompanied the History.

Apart from his pupil, Theophrastus, who wrote a matching Enquiry into Plants, no research of comparable scope was carried out in ancient Greece, though Hellenistic medicine in Egypt continued Aristotle's inquiry into the mechanisms of the human body. Aristotle's biology was influential in the medieval Islamic world. Translation of Arabic versions and commentaries into Latin brought knowledge of Aristotle back into Western Europe, but the only biological work widely taught in medieval universities was On the Soul. The association of his work with medieval scholasticism, as well as errors in his theories, caused Early Modern scientists such as Galileo and William Harvey to reject Aristotle. Criticism of his errors and secondhand reports continued for centuries. He has found better acceptance among zoologists, and some of his long-derided observations in marine biology have been found in modern times to be true.

== Context ==
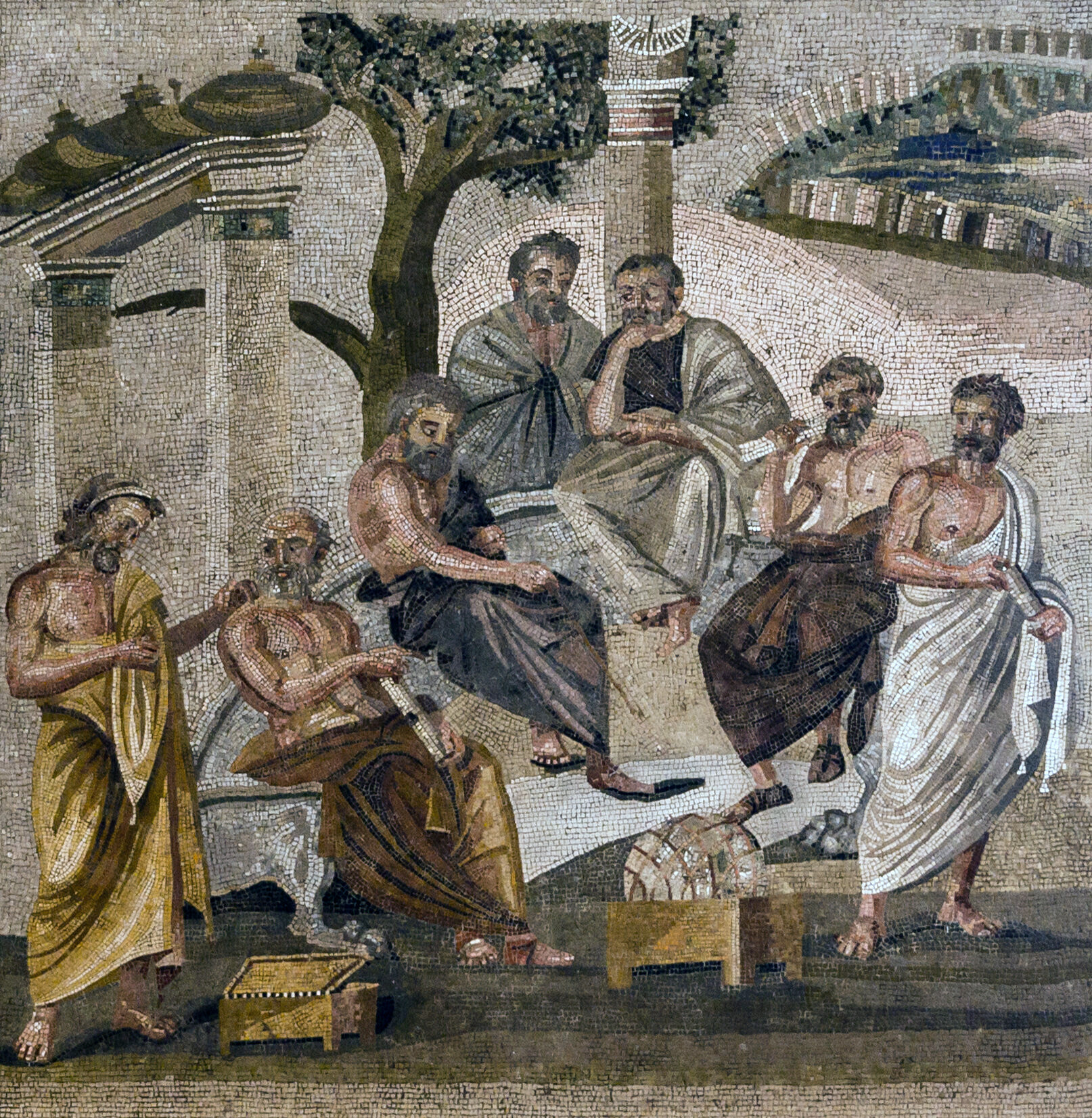
Aristotle spent some 20 years at Plato's academy in Athens.

=== Aristotle's background ===
Aristotle (384–322 BC) studied at Plato's Academy in Athens, remaining there for about 20 years. Like Plato, he sought universals in his philosophy, but unlike Plato he backed up his views with detailed and systematic observation, notably of the natural history of the island of Lesbos, where he spent about two years, and the marine life in the seas around it, especially of the Pyrrha lagoon in the island's centre. This study makes him the earliest scientist whose written work survives. No similarly detailed work on zoology was attempted until the sixteenth century; accordingly Aristotle remained highly influential for some two thousand years. He returned to Athens and founded his own school, the Lycaeum, where he taught for the last dozen years of his life. His writings on zoology form about a quarter of his surviving work. Aristotle's pupil Theophrastus later wrote a similar book on botany, Enquiry into Plants.

=== Aristotelian forms ===
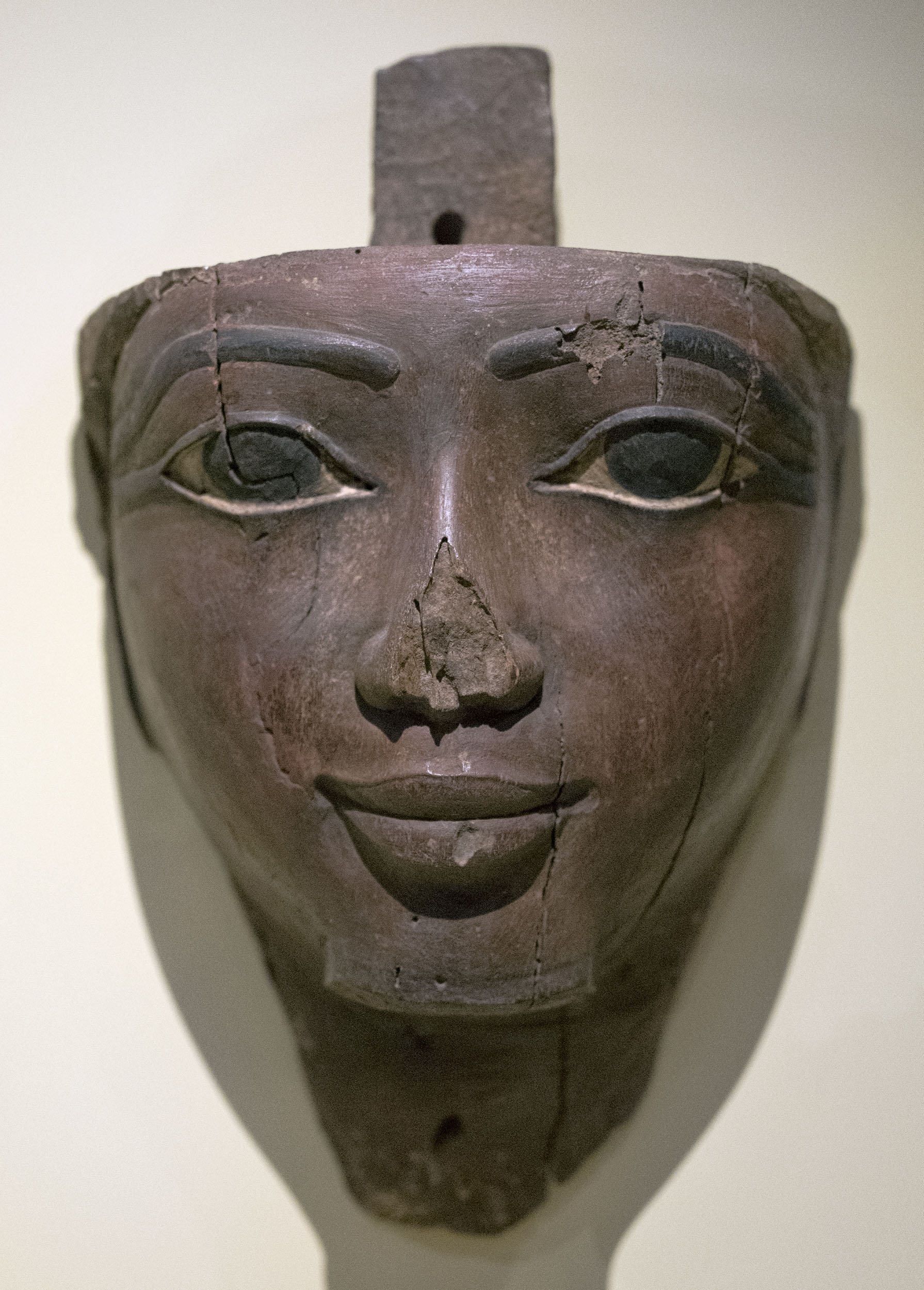
Aristotle argued by analogy with a woodcarving that a thing takes its form both from its design and from the material used.

Aristotle's biology is constructed on the basis of his theory of form, which is derived from Plato's theory of Forms, but significantly different from it. Plato's Forms were eternal and fixed, being "blueprints in the mind of God". Real things in the world could, in Plato's view, at best be approximations to these perfect Forms. Aristotle heard Plato's view and developed it into a set of three biological concepts. He uses the same Greek word, εἶδος (eidos), to mean first of all the set of visible features that uniquely characterised a kind of animal. Aristotle used the word γένος (génos) to mean a kind. (Note: The English and taxonomic Latin genus derive from this, and have related meanings.) For example, the kind of animal called a bird has feathers, a beak, wings, a hard-shelled egg, and warm blood.

Aristotle further noted that there are many bird forms within the bird kind – cranes, eagles, crows, bustards, sparrows, and so on, just as there are many forms of fishes within the fish kind. He sometimes called these atoma eidē, indivisible forms. (Note: In modern terms, it has been argued that these roughly correspond to species, and some texts use that translation. Aristotle did not formulate a definition resembling that of a modern species, however, and some of his forms are other taxa such as genera or families.) Human is one of these indivisible forms: Socrates and the rest of us are all different individually, but we all have human form. More recent studies have shown that Aristotle used the terms γένος (génos) and εἶδος (eidos) in a relative way. A taxon that is considered an eidos in one context can be considered a génos (which includes various eide) in another.

Finally, Aristotle observed that the child does not take just any form, but is given it by the parents' seeds, which combine. These seeds thus contain form, or in modern terms information. (Note: From Latin informo, I form, give shape to.) Aristotle makes clear that he sometimes intends this third sense by giving the analogy of a woodcarving. It takes its form from wood (its material cause); the tools and carving technique used to make it (its efficient cause); and the design laid out for it (its eidos or embedded information). Aristotle further emphasises the informational nature of form by arguing that a body is compounded of elements like earth and fire, just as a word is compounded of letters in a specific order. (Note: In modern terms, this implies a symbolic system. Armand Leroi notes that biologists will at once think in this context of the nucleotide "letters" of DNA which give form to organisms.)

== System ==
=== Soul as system ===
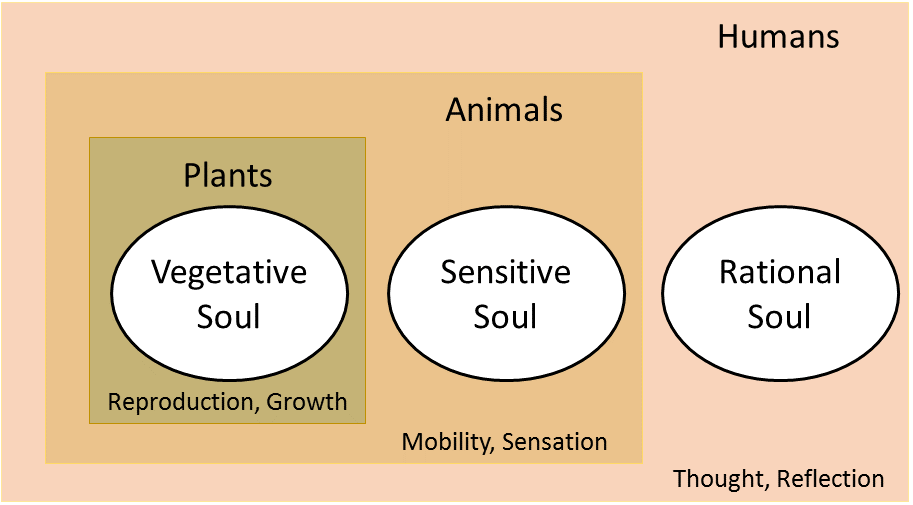
Aristotle described the structure of the souls of plants, animals, and humans, stating that humans are unique in having all three types of soul.

As analysed by the evolutionary biologist Armand Leroi, Aristotle's biology included five major interlocking processes:

1. a metabolic process, whereby animals take in matter, change its qualities, and distribute these to use to grow, live, and reproduce
2. a cycle of temperature regulation, whereby animals maintain a steady state, but which progressively fails in old age
3. an information processing model whereby animals receive sensory information, alter it in the seat of sensation, (Note: Like the ancient Egyptians, Aristotle believed that the seat of the rational and sensitive souls was the heart, not the brain) and use it to drive movements of the limbs. He thus separated sensation from thought, unlike all previous philosophers except Alcmaeon.
4. the process of inheritance.
5. the processes of embryonic development and of spontaneous generation

The five processes formed what Aristotle called the soul: it was not something extra, but the system consisting exactly of these mechanisms. The Aristotelian soul died with the animal and was thus purely biological. Different types of organism possessed different types of soul. Plants had a vegetative soul, responsible for reproduction and growth. Animals had both a vegetative and a sensitive soul, responsible for mobility and sensation. Humans, uniquely, had a vegetative, a sensitive, and a rational soul, capable of thought and reflection.

=== Processes ===
==== Metabolism ====
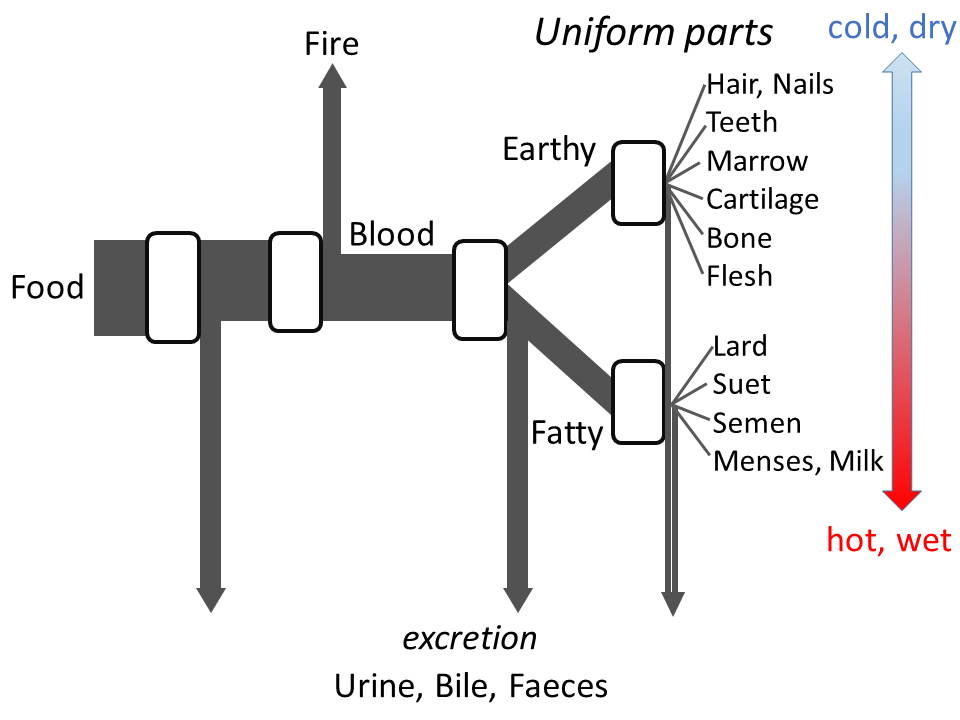
Metabolism: Leroi's open system model. Food is converted to the body's uniform parts and excreted residues.

Aristotle's account of metabolism sought to explain how food was processed by the body to provide both heat and the materials for the body's construction and maintenance. The metabolic system for live-bearing tetrapods (Note: Corresponding to mammals.) described in the Parts of Animals can be modelled as an open system, a branching tree of flows of material through the body.

The system worked as follows. The incoming material, food, enters the body and is concocted into blood; waste is excreted as urine, bile, and faeces, and the element fire is released as heat. Blood is made into flesh, the rest forming other earthy tissues such as bones, teeth, cartilages and sinews. Leftover blood is made into fat, whether soft suet or hard lard. Some fat from all around the body is made into semen.

All the tissues are in Aristotle's view completely uniform parts with no internal structure of any kind; a cartilage for example was the same all the way through, not subdivided into atoms as Democritus (c. 460–c. 370 BC) had argued. The uniform parts can be arranged on a scale of Aristotelian qualities, from the coldest and driest, such as hair, to the hottest and wettest, such as milk.

At each stage of metabolism, residual materials are excreted as faeces, urine, and bile.

==== Temperature regulation ====
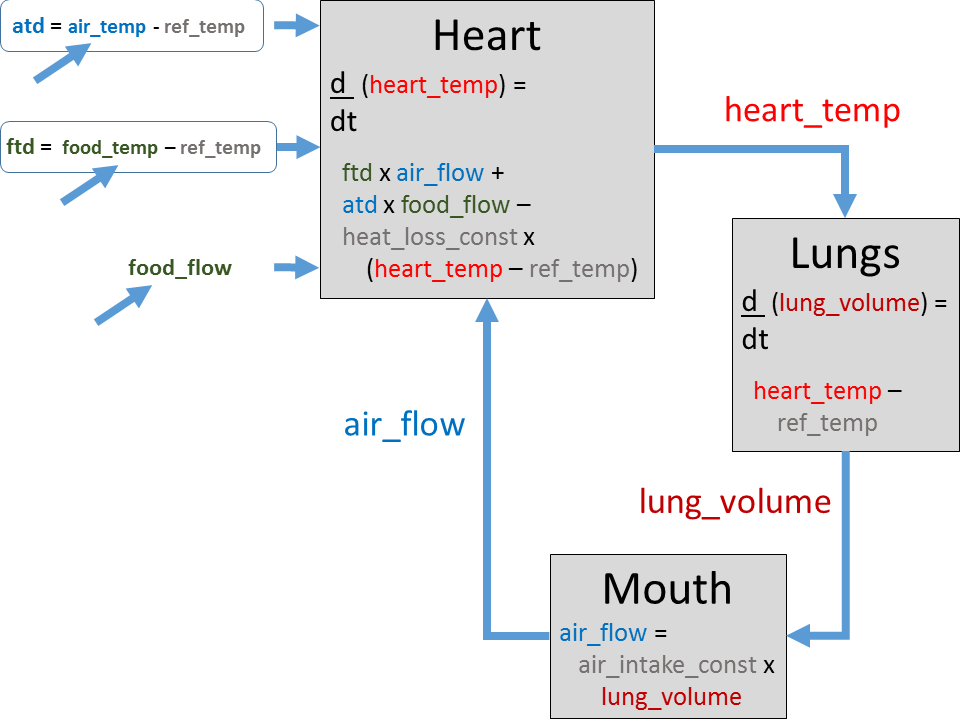
Temperature regulation: Leroi's model based on Youth and Old Age, Life and Death 26.

Aristotle's account of temperature regulation sought to explain how an animal maintained a steady temperature and the continued oscillation of the thorax needed for breathing. The system of regulation of temperature and breathing described in Youth and Old Age, Life and Death 26 is sufficiently detailed to permit modelling as a negative feedback control system (one that maintains a desired property by opposing disturbances to it), with a few assumptions such as a desired temperature to compare the actual temperature against.

The system worked as follows. Heat is constantly lost from the body. Food products reach the heart and are processed into new blood, releasing fire during metabolism, which raises the blood temperature too high. That raises the heart temperature, causing lung volume to increase, in turn raising the airflow at the mouth. The cool air brought in through the mouth reduces the heart temperature, so the lung volume accordingly decreases, restoring the temperature to normal. (Note: In modern terms, this is homeostasis.)

The mechanism only works if the air is cooler than the reference temperature. If the air is hotter than that, the system becomes a positive feedback cycle, the body's fire is put out, and death follows. The system as described damps out fluctuations in temperature. Aristotle however predicted that his system would cause lung oscillation (breathing), which is possible given extra assumptions such as of delays or non-linear responses.

==== Information processing ====
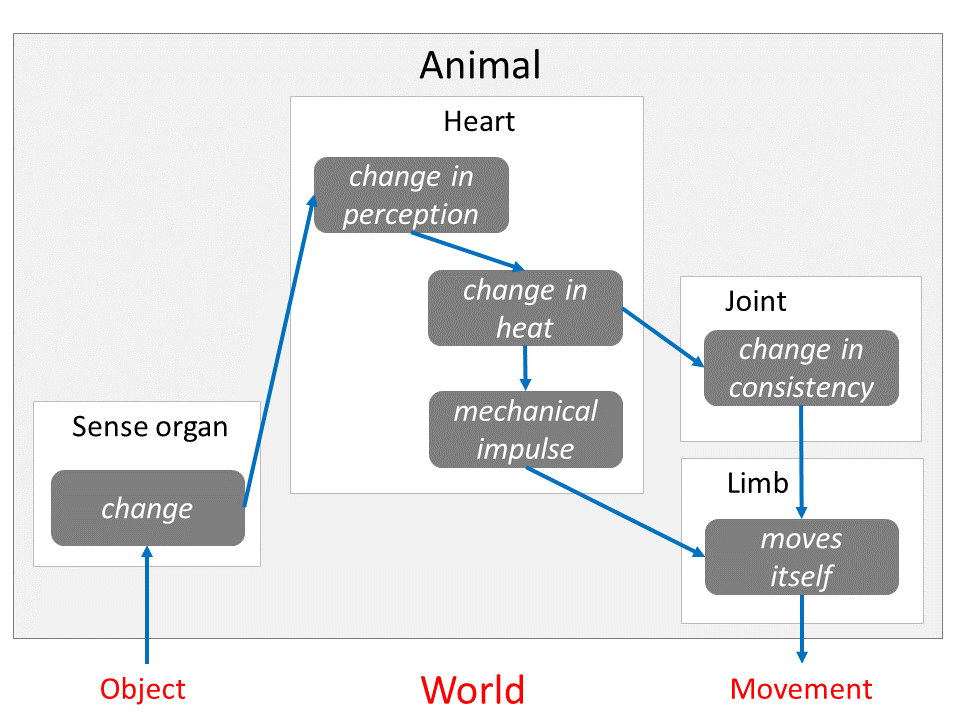
Information processing: Leroi's "centralized incoming and outgoing motions model" of an animal's "sensitive soul"; the heart is the seat of perception.

Aristotle's information processing model has been named the "centralized incoming and outgoing motions model". It sought to explain how changes in the world led to appropriate behaviour in the animal.

The system worked as follows. The animal's sense organ is altered when it detects an object. This causes a perceptual change in the animal's seat of sensation, which Aristotle believed was the heart (cardiocentrism) rather than the brain. This in turn causes a change in the heart's heat, which causes a quantitative change sufficient to make the heart transmit a mechanical impulse to a limb, which moves, moving the animal's body. The alteration in the heat of the heart also causes a change in the consistency of the joints, which helps the limb to move.

There is thus a causal chain which transmits information from a sense organ to an organ capable of making decisions, and onwards to a motor organ. In this respect, the model is analogous to a modern understanding of information processing such as in sensory-motor coupling.

==== Inheritance ====
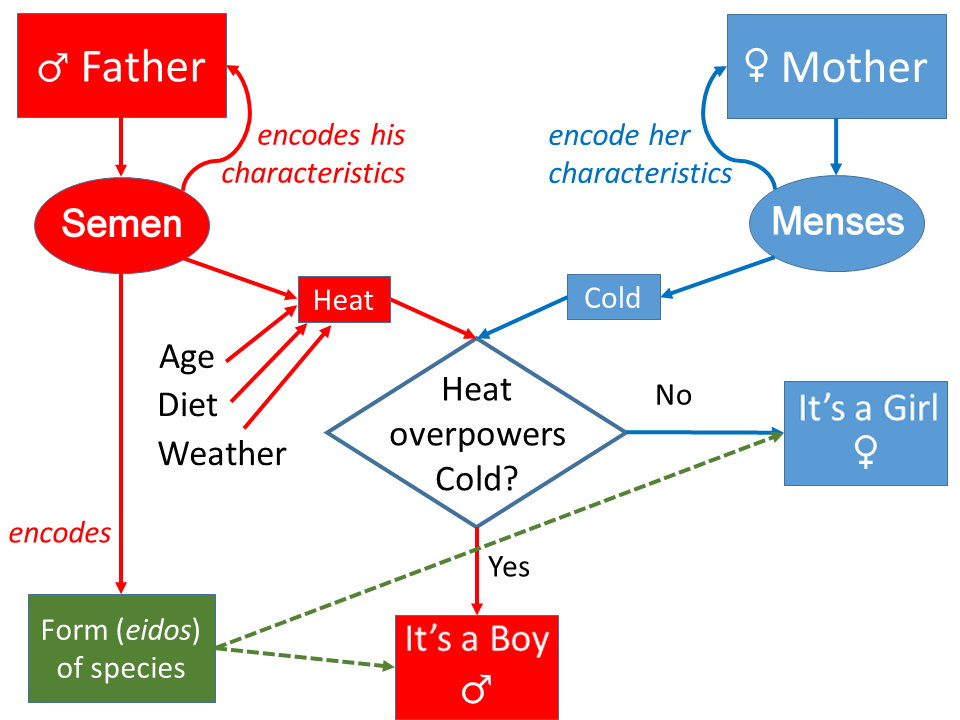
Inheritance: model of transmission of movements from parents to child, and of form from the father. Male aspects are shown in red; female aspects in blue. The model is not fully symmetric.

Aristotle's inheritance model sought to explain how the parents' characteristics are transmitted to the child, subject to influence from the environment. (Note: The relative importance of parental characteristics and environment became the subject of the modern nature-nurture debate.)

The system worked as follows. The father's semen and the mother's menses have movements that encode their parental characteristics. The model is partly asymmetric, as only the father's movements define the form or eidos of the species, while the movements of both the father's and the mother's uniform parts define features other than the form, such as the father's eye colour or the mother's nose shape.

Aristotle's theory has some symmetry, as semen movements carry maleness while the menses carry femaleness. If the semen is hot enough to overpower the cold menses, the child will be a boy; but if it is too cold to do this, the child will be a girl. Inheritance is thus particulate (definitely one trait or another), as in Mendelian genetics, unlike the Hippocratic model which was continuous and blending.

The child's sex can be influenced by factors that affect temperature, including the weather, the wind direction, diet, and the father's age. Features other than sex also depend on whether the semen overpowers the menses, so if a man has strong semen, he will have sons who resemble him, while if the semen is weak, he will have daughters who resemble their mother. (Note: Thus features are, in modern terms, sex-linked.)

==== Embryogenesis ====
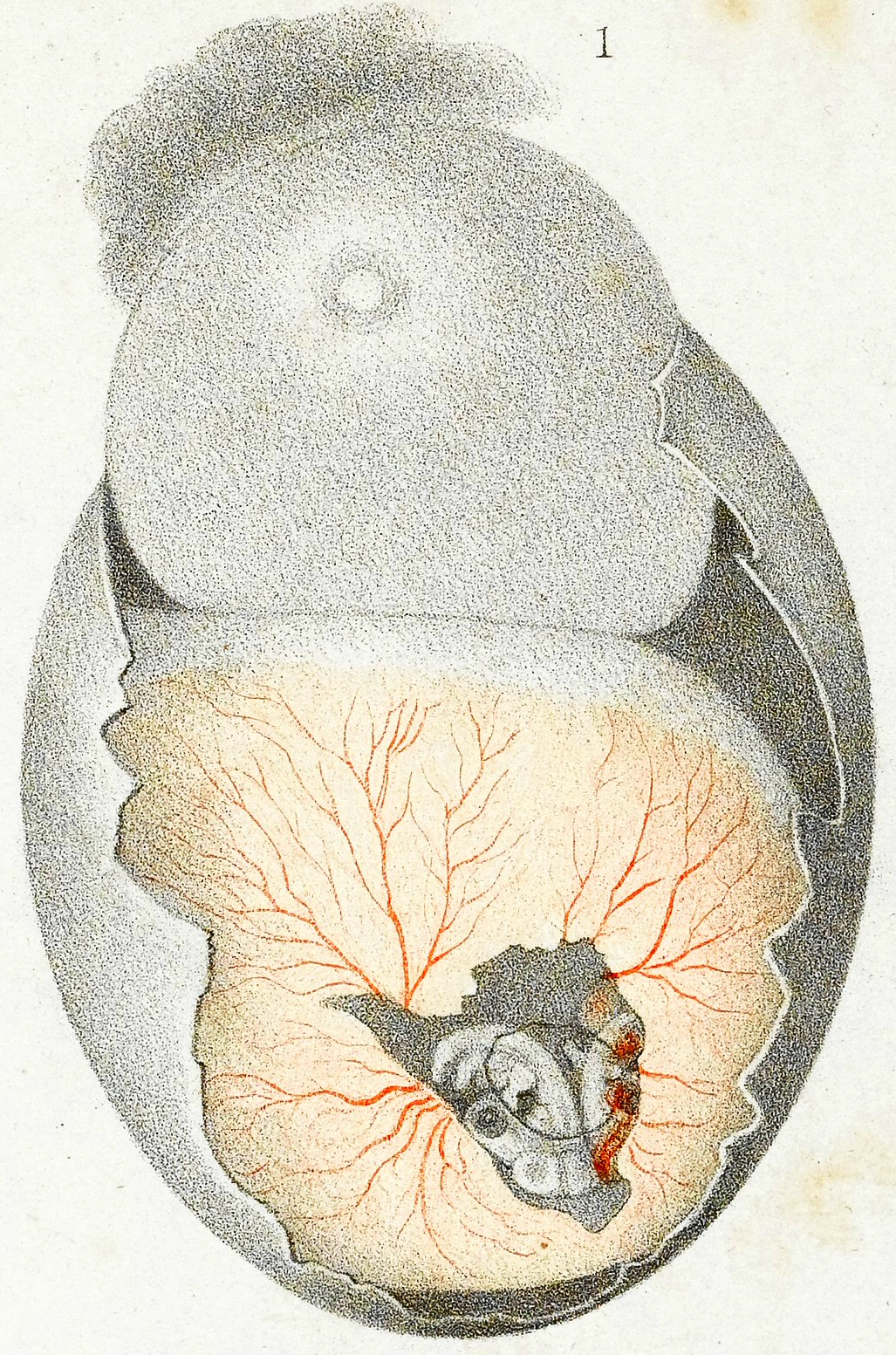
Embryogenesis: Aristotle saw the chick embryo's heart beating. 19th century drawing by Peter Panum

Aristotle's model of embryogenesis sought to explain how the inherited parental characteristics cause the formation and development of an embryo.

The system worked as follows. First, the father's semen curdles the mother's menses, which Aristotle compares with how rennet (an enzyme from a cow's stomach) curdles milk in cheesemaking. This forms the embryo; it is then developed by the action of the pneuma (literally, breath or spirit) in the semen. The pneuma first makes the heart appear; this is vital, as the heart nourishes all other organs. Aristotle observed that the heart is the first organ seen to be active (beating) in a hen's egg. The pneuma then makes the other organs develop.

Aristotle asserts in his Physics that according to Empedocles, order "spontaneously" appears in the developing embryo. In The Parts of Animals, he argues that what he describes as a theory of Empedocles, that the vertebral column is divided into vertebrae because, as it happens, the embryo twists about and snaps the column into pieces, is wrong. Aristotle argues instead that the process has a predefined goal: that the "seed" that develops into the embryo began with an inbuilt "potential" to become specific body parts, such as vertebrae. Further, each sort of animal gives rise to animals of its own kind: humans only have human babies.

== Method ==
Aristotle has been called unscientific by philosophers from Francis Bacon onwards for at least two reasons: his scientific style, and his use of explanation. His explanations are in turn made cryptic by his complicated system of causes. However, these charges need to be considered in the light of what was known in his own time. His systematic gathering of data, too, is obscured by the lack of modern methods of presentation, such as tables of data: for example, the whole of History of Animals Book VI is taken up with a list of observations of the life histories of birds that "would now be summarized in a single table in Nature – and in the Online Supplementary Information at that".

=== Scientific style ===
Aristotle inferred growth laws from his observations on animals, including that brood size decreases with body mass, whereas gestation period increases. He was correct in these predictions, at least for mammals: data are shown for mouse and elephant.

Aristotle did not do experiments in the modern sense. He used the ancient Greek term pepeiramenoi to mean observations, or at most investigative procedures, such as (in Generation of Animals) finding a fertilised hen's egg of a suitable stage and opening it so as to be able to see the embryo's heart inside.

Instead, he practised a different style of science: systematically gathering data, discovering patterns common to whole groups of animals, and inferring possible causal explanations from these. This style is common in modern biology when large amounts of data become available in a new field, such as genomics. It does not result in the same certainty as experimental science, but it sets out testable hypotheses and constructs a narrative explanation of what is observed. In this sense, Aristotle's biology is scientific.

From the data he collected and documented, Aristotle inferred quite a number of rules relating the life-history features of the live-bearing tetrapods (terrestrial placental mammals (Note: Excluding the Cetacea (whales and dolphins) and Chiroptera (bats).)) that he studied. Among these correct predictions are the following. Brood size decreases with (adult) body mass, so that an elephant has fewer young (usually just one) per brood than a mouse. Lifespan increases with gestation period, and also with body mass, so that elephants live longer than mice, have a longer period of gestation, and are heavier. As a final example, fecundity decreases with lifespan, so long-lived kinds like elephants have fewer young in total than short-lived kinds like mice.

=== Mechanism and analogy ===
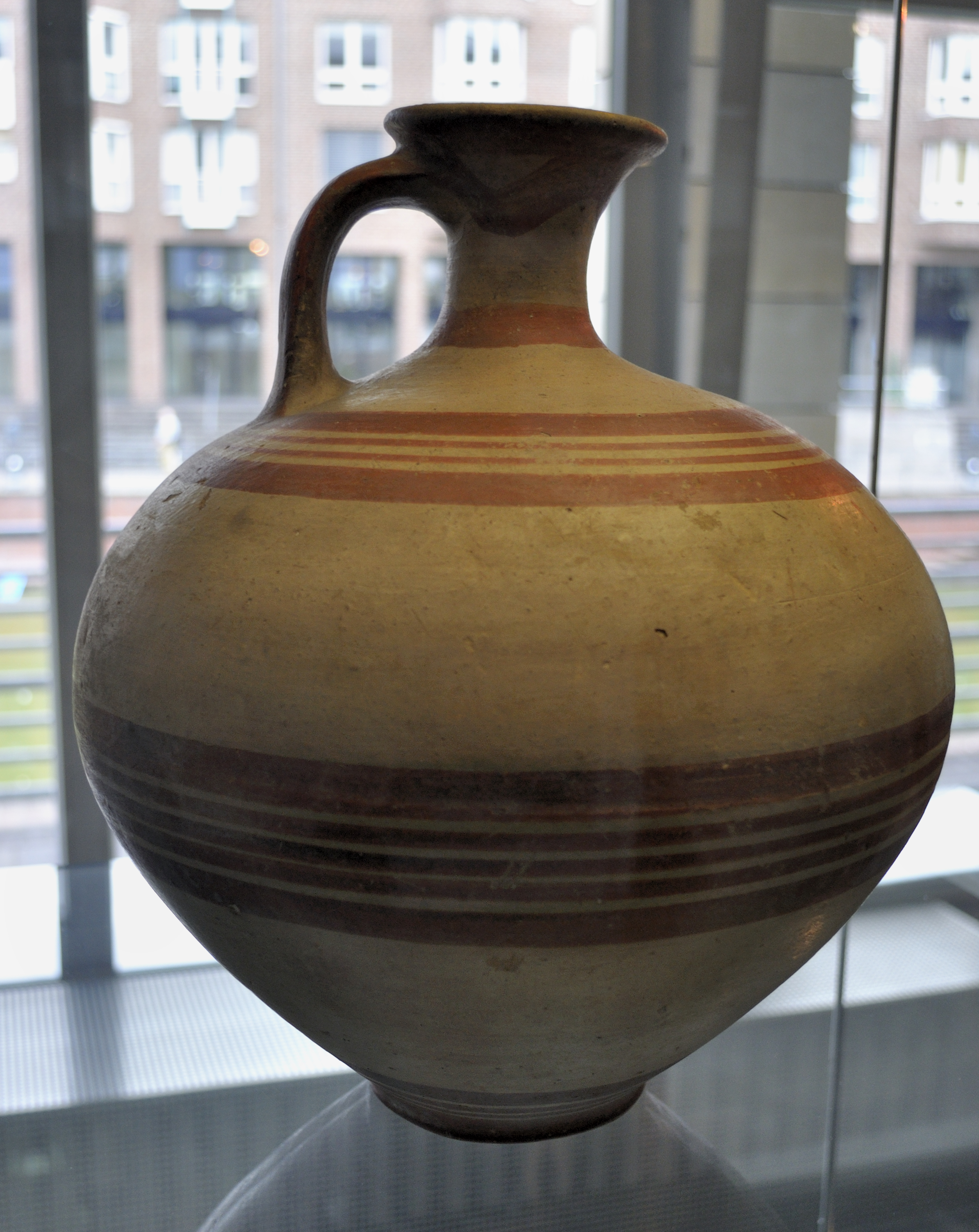
Aristotle used the analogy of the movement of water through a porous pot (an oenochoe shown) to help explain biological processes as mechanisms.

Aristotle's use of explanation has been considered "fundamentally unscientific". The French playwright Molière's 1673 play The Imaginary Invalid portrays the quack Aristotelian doctor Argan blandly explaining that opium causes sleep by virtue of its dormitive [sleep-making] principle, its virtus dormitiva. (Note: First Doctor: Most learned bachelor / Whom I esteem and honor, I would like to ask you the cause and reason why / Opium makes one sleep. Argan [the Aristotelian]: ... The reason is that in opium resides / A dormitive virtue, Of which it is the nature / To stupefy the senses.) Argan's explanation is at best empty (devoid of mechanism), at worst vitalist. But the real Aristotle did provide biological mechanisms, in the form of the five processes of metabolism, temperature regulation, information processing, embryonic development, and inheritance that he developed. Further, he provided mechanical, non-vitalist analogies for these theories, mentioning bellows, toy carts, the movement of water through porous pots, and even automatic puppets.

=== Complex causality ===
Readers of Aristotle have found the four causes that he uses in his biological explanations opaque, something not helped by many centuries of confused exegesis. For a biological system, these are however straightforward enough. The material cause is simply what a system is constructed from. The goal (final cause) and formal cause are what something is for, its function: to a modern biologist, such teleology describes adaptation under the pressure of natural selection. The efficient cause is how a system develops and moves: to a modern biologist, those are explained by developmental biology and physiology. Biologists continue to offer explanations of these same kinds.

=== Empirical research ===
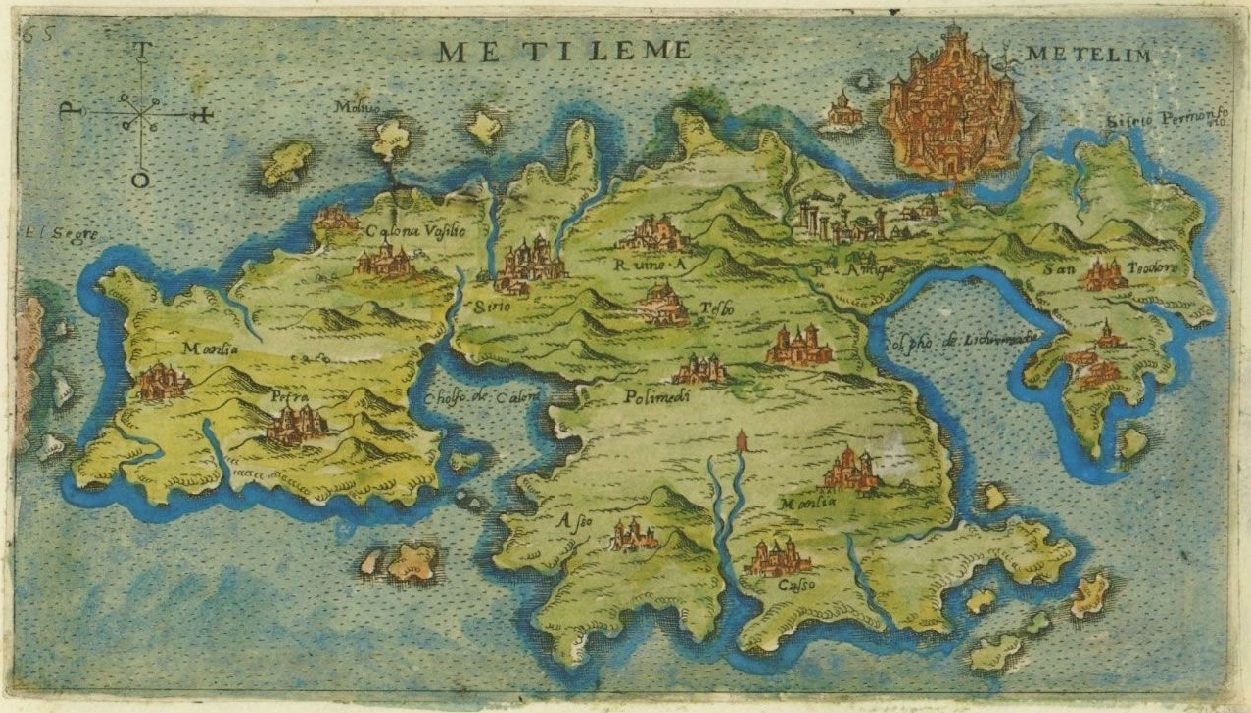
Map of Lesbos by Giacomo Franco (1597). The lagoon near Kalloni (labelled "Calona") where Aristotle studied marine zoology is in the centre of the island.

Aristotle was the first person to study biology systematically. He spent two years observing and describing the zoology of Lesbos and the surrounding seas, including in particular the Pyrrha lagoon in the centre of Lesbos. His data are assembled from his own observations, statements given by people with specialised knowledge such as beekeepers and fishermen, and less accurate accounts provided by travellers from overseas.

His observations on catfish, electric fish (Torpedo) and angler fish are detailed, as is his writing on cephalopods including the octopus, cuttlefish and paper nautilus. He reported that fishermen had asserted that the octopus's hectocotyl arm was used in sexual reproduction. He admitted its use in mating 'only for the sake of attachment', but rejected the idea that it was useful for generation, since "it is outside the passage and indeed outside the body". In the 19th century, biologists found that the reported function was correct. He separated the aquatic mammals from fish, and knew that sharks and rays were part of the group he called Selachē (roughly, the modern zoologist's selachians (Note: It is not safe to assume that species or groups with Linnean names that resemble Aristotle's are the animals he was referring to, as zoologists including Linnaeus guessed rightly or wrongly what Aristotle meant in his short descriptions. Sometimes an ancient Greek name must mean exactly one species – hippos is definitely horse, when it's a land animal; but sometimes a name referred to several similar species, as English names often do today: for instance, kephalos means any of 4 species of grey mullet.)).

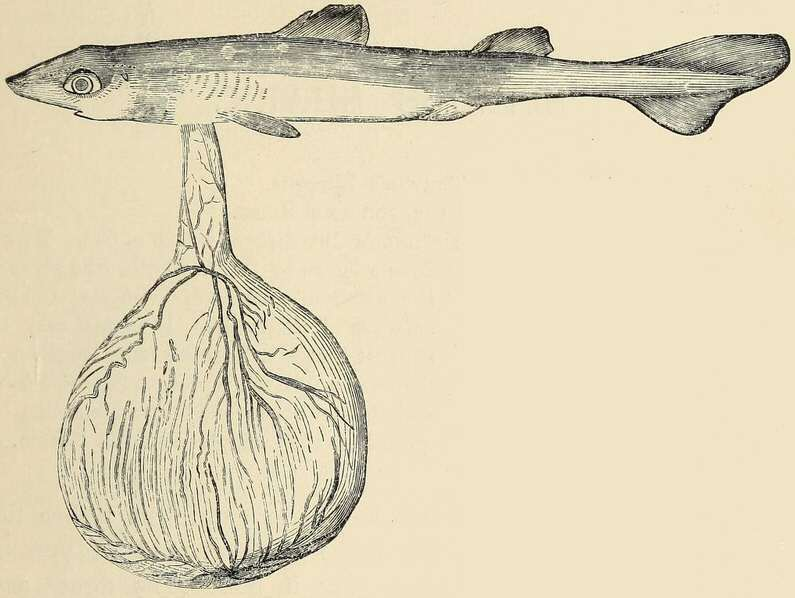
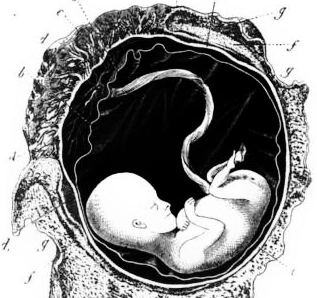
Aristotle recorded that the embryo of a dogfish (left) was attached by a cord to something like a mammalian placenta (right), in fact a yolk sac.

Among many other things, he gave accurate descriptions of the four-chambered stomachs of ruminants, and of the ovoviviparous embryological development of the dogfish. His accounts of about 35 animals are sufficiently detailed to convince biologists that he dissected those species, indeed vivisecting some; he mentions the internal anatomy of roughly 110 animals in total.

Aristotle described beekeeping with the use of smoke in History of Animals Book 9. The account mentions that bees die after stinging; that workers remove corpses from the hive, and guard it; castes including workers and non-working drones, but "kings" rather than queens; predators including toads and bee-eaters; and the waggle dance, with the "irresistible suggestion" of άροσειονται ("aroseiontai", it waggles) and παρακολουθούσιν ("parakolouthousin", they watch).

=== Classification ===
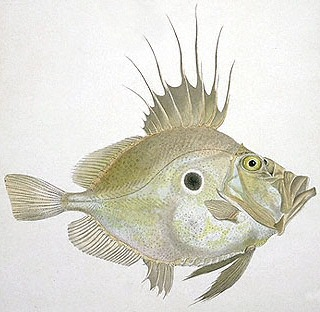
The khalkeus (John Dory) was one of the many fish named by Aristotle.

Aristotle distinguished about 500 species of birds, mammals, actinopterygians and selachians in History of Animals and Parts of Animals. Aristotle distinguished animals with blood, Enhaima (the modern zoologist's vertebrates) and animals without blood, Anhaima (invertebrates). (Note: Aristotle did not know that complex invertebrates do make use of haemoglobin, but of a different kind from vertebrates.)

Aristotle's Scala naturae (highest to lowest)
Group	Examples (given by Aristotle)	Blood	Legs	Soul (Rational, Sensitive, Vegetative)	Qualities (Hot–Cold, Wet–Dry)
Man	Man	with blood	2 legs	R, S, V	Hot, Wet
Live-bearing tetrapods	Cat, hare	with blood	4 legs	S, V	Hot, Wet
Cetaceans	Dolphin, whale	with blood	none	S, V	Hot, Wet
Birds	Bee-eater, nightjar	with blood	2 legs	S, V	Hot, Wet, except Dry eggs
Egg-laying tetrapods	Chameleon, crocodile	with blood	4 legs	S, V	Cold, Wet except scales, eggs
Snakes	Water snake, Ottoman viper	with blood	none	S, V	Cold, Wet except scales, eggs
Egg-laying fishes	Sea bass, parrotfish	with blood	none	S, V	Cold, Wet, including eggs
(Among egg-laying fishes): placental selachians	Shark, skate	with blood	none	S, V	Cold, Wet, but placenta like tetrapods
Crustaceans	Shrimp, crab	without	Several legs	S, V	Cold, Wet except shell
Cephalopods	Squid, octopus	without	tentacles	S, V	Cold, Wet
Hard-shelled animals	Cockle, trumpet snail	without	none	S, V	Cold, Dry (mineral shell)
Larva-bearing insects	Ant, cicada	without	6 legs	S, V	Cold, Dry
Spontaneously generating	Sponges, worms	without	none	S, V	Cold, Wet or Dry, from earth
Plants	Fig	without	none	V	Cold, Dry
Minerals	Iron	without	none	none	Cold, Dry

Animals with blood included live-bearing tetrapods, Zōiotoka tetrapoda (roughly, the mammals), being warm, having four legs, and giving birth to their young. The cetaceans, Kētōdē, also had blood and gave birth to live young, but did not have legs, and therefore formed a separate group (Note: Aristotle did not nest his groups into a hierarchical tree.) (megista genē, defined by a set of functioning "parts"). The birds, Ornithes had blood and laid eggs, but had only 2 legs and were a distinct form (eidos) with feathers and beaks instead of teeth, so they too formed a distinct group, of over 50 kinds. The egg-bearing tetrapods, Ōiotoka tetrapoda (reptiles and amphibians) had blood and four legs, but were cold and laid eggs, so were a distinct group. The snakes, Opheis, similarly had blood, but no legs, and laid dry eggs, so were a separate group. The fishes, Ikhthyes, had blood but no legs, and laid wet eggs, forming a definite group. Among them, the selachians Selakhē (sharks and rays), had cartilages instead of bones and were viviparous (Aristotle did not know that some selachians are oviparous).

Animals without blood were divided into soft-shelled Malakostraka (crabs, lobsters, and shrimps); hard-shelled Ostrakoderma (gastropods and bivalves); soft-bodied Malakia (cephalopods); and divisible animals Entoma (insects, spiders, scorpions, ticks). Other animals without blood included fish lice, hermit crabs, red coral, sea anemones, sponges, starfish and various worms: Aristotle did not classify these into groups, although Aristotle mentioned that the sea anemone was in its "own group".

=== Scale of being ===
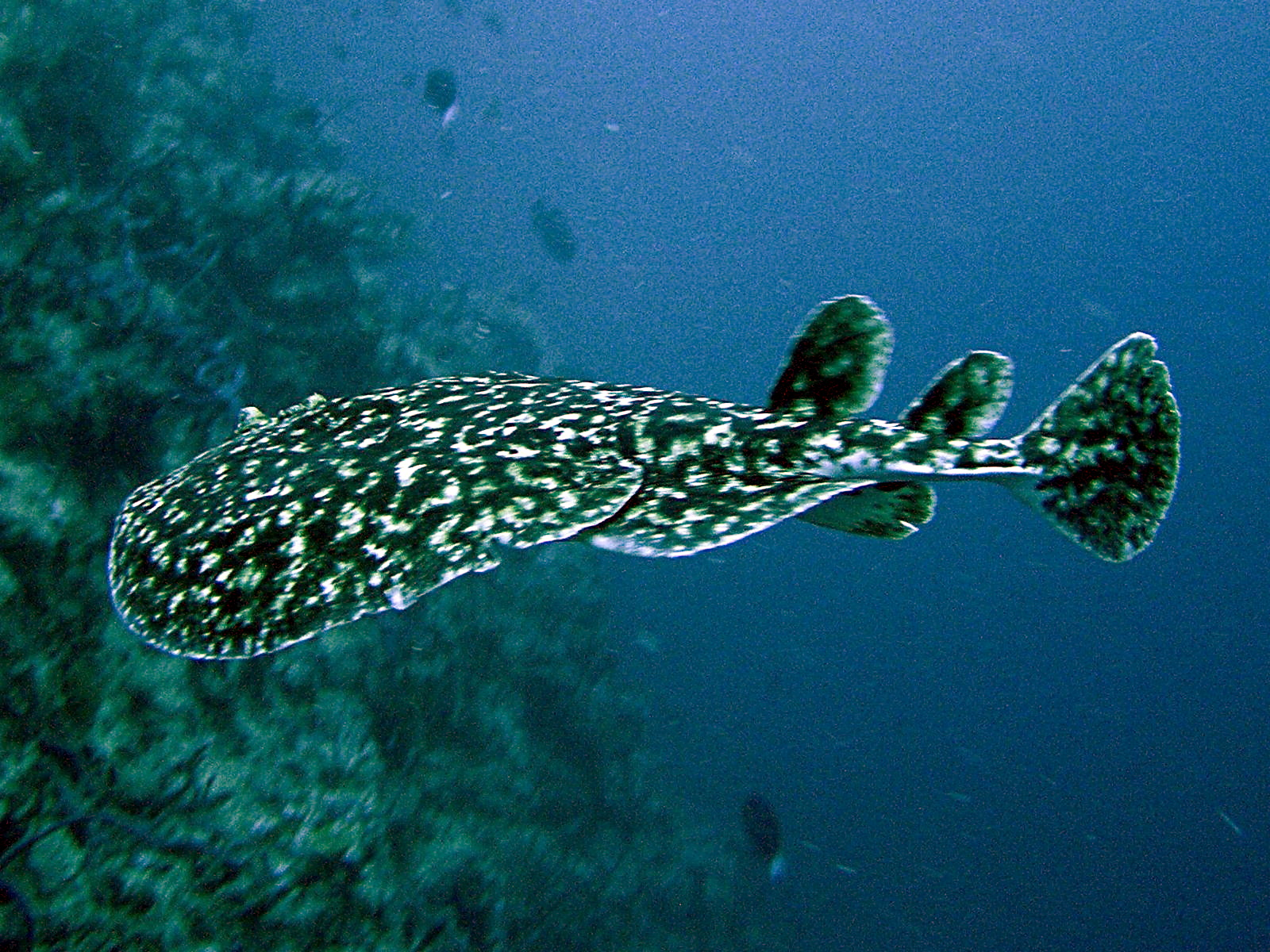
Aristotle reported correctly that electric rays were able to stun their prey.

Aristotle stated in the History of Animals that all beings were arranged in a fixed scale of perfection, reflected in their form (eidos). (Note: To a modern biologist, such a scale suggests evolution, but Aristotle saw it as a permanent, eternal arrangement.) They stretched from minerals to plants and animals, and on up to man, forming the scala naturae or great chain of being. His system had eleven grades, arranged according to the potentiality of each being, expressed in their form at birth. The highest animals gave birth to warm and wet creatures alive, the lowest bore theirs cold, dry, and in thick eggs. The system was based on Aristotle's interpretation of the four elements in his On Generation and Corruption: Fire (hot and dry); Air (hot and wet); Water (cold and wet); and Earth (cold and dry). These are arranged from the most energetic to the least, so the warm, wet young raised in a womb with a placenta were higher on the scale than the cold, dry, nearly mineral eggs of birds. However, Aristotle is careful never to insist that a group fits perfectly in the scale; he knows animals have many combinations of attributes, and that placements are approximate.

== Influence ==
=== On Theophrastus ===
Aristotle's pupil and successor at the Lyceum, Theophrastus, wrote the History of Plants, the first classical book of botany. It has an Aristotelian structure, but rather than focus on formal causes, as Aristotle did, Theophrastus described how plants functioned. Where Aristotle expanded on grand theories, Theophrastus was quietly empirical. Where Aristotle insisted that species have a fixed place on the scala naturae, Theophrastus suggests that one kind of plant can transform into another, as when a field sown to wheat turns to the weed darnel.

=== On Hellenistic medicine ===
After Theophrastus, though interest in Aristotle's ideas survived, they were generally taken unquestioningly. It is not until the age of Alexandria under the Ptolemies that advances in biology resumed. The first medical teacher at Alexandria, Herophilus of Chalcedon, corrected Aristotle, placing intelligence in the brain, and connected the nervous system to motion and sensation. Herophilus also distinguished between veins and arteries, noting that the latter pulse while the former do not.

=== On Islamic zoology ===
Many classical works including those of Aristotle were transmitted from Greek to Syriac, then to Arabic, then to Latin in the Middle Ages. Aristotle remained the principal authority in biology for the next two thousand years. The Kitāb al-Hayawān (كتاب الحيوان, Book of Animals) is a 9th-century Arabic translation of History of Animals: 1–10, On the Parts of Animals: 11–14, and Generation of Animals: 15–19.

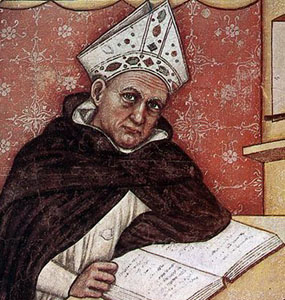
Albertus Magnus commented extensively on Aristotle's zoology, adding more of his own.

The book was mentioned by Al-Kindī (d. 850), and commented on by Avicenna (Ibn Sīnā) in his Kitāb al-Šifā (کتاب الشفاء, The Book of Healing). Avempace (Ibn Bājja) and Averroes (Ibn Rushd) commented on On the Parts of Animals and Generation of Animals, Averroes criticising Avempace's interpretations.

=== On medieval science ===
When the Christian king Alfonso VI of Castile conquered Toledo from the Moors in 1085, an Arabic translation of Aristotle's works, with commentaries by Avicenna and Averroes emerged into European medieval scholarship. Michael Scot translated much of Aristotle's biology into Latin, c. 1225, along with many of Averroes's commentaries. (Note: Scot translated HA, GA, and PA, and all of the Parva Naturalia.) Albertus Magnus commented extensively on Aristotle, but added his own zoological observations and an encyclopedia of animals based on Thomas of Cantimpré. Later in the 13th century, Thomas Aquinas merged Aristotle's metaphysics with Christian theology. Whereas Albert had treated Aristotle's biology as science, writing that experiment was the only safe guide and joining in with the types of observation that Aristotle had made, Aquinas saw Aristotle purely as theory, and Aristotelian thought became associated with scholasticism. The scholastic natural philosophy curriculum omitted most of Aristotle's biology, but included On the Soul.

=== On Renaissance science ===
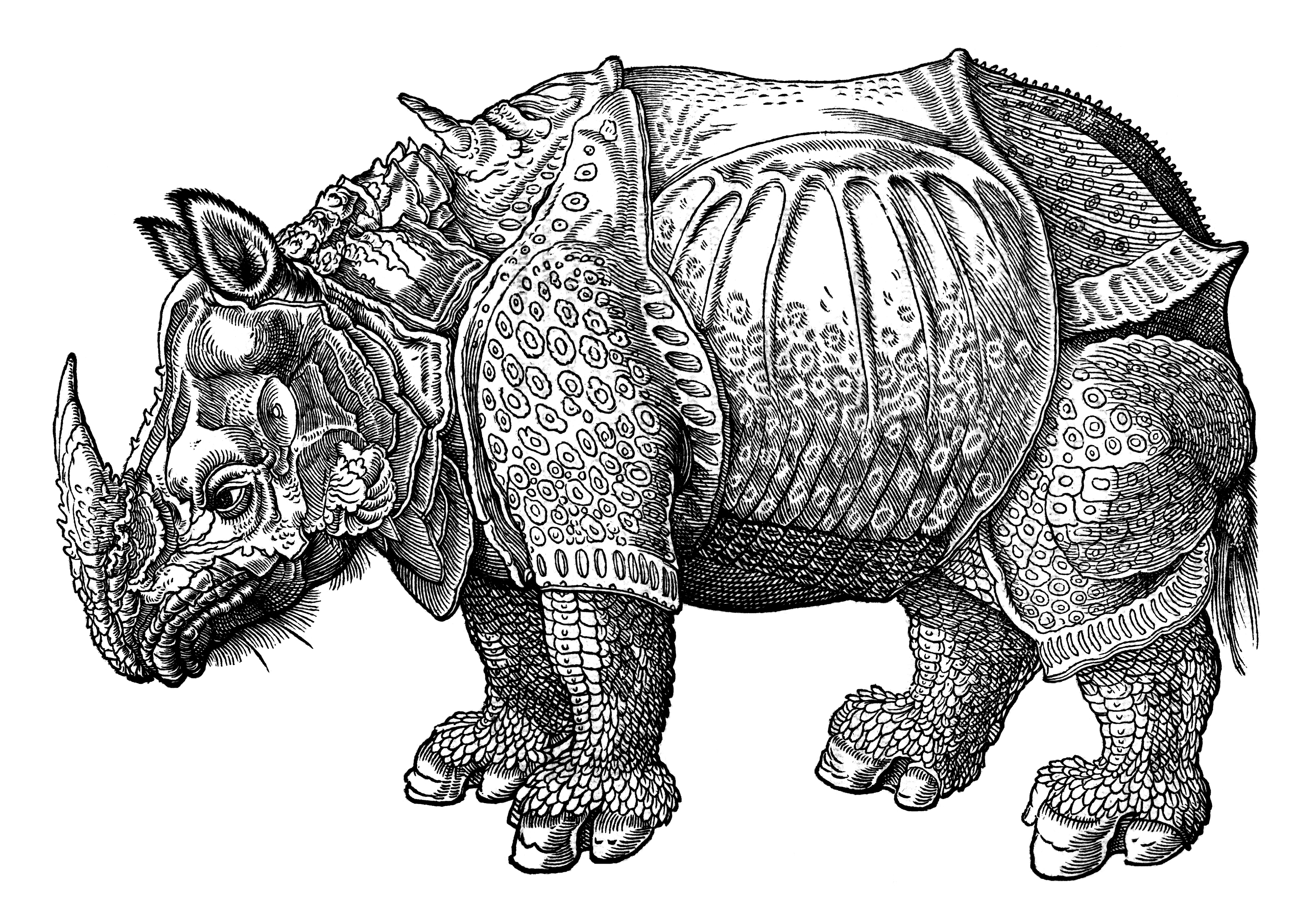
Dürer's Rhinoceros in Konrad Gessner's Historia Animalium, 1551

Renaissance zoologists made use of Aristotle's zoology in two ways. Especially in Italy, scholars such as Pietro Pomponazzi and Agostino Nifo lectured and wrote commentaries on Aristotle. Elsewhere, authors used Aristotle as one of their sources, alongside their own and their colleagues' observations, to create new encyclopedias such as Konrad Gessner's 1551 Historia Animalium. (Note: Gessner borrowed the title from one of Aristotle's books.) The title and the philosophical approach were Aristotelian, but the work was largely new. Edward Wotton similarly helped to found modern zoology by arranging the animals according to Aristotle's theories, separating out folklore from his 1552 De differentiis animalium. Aristotle's system of classification had thus remained influential for many centuries.

=== Early Modern rejection ===
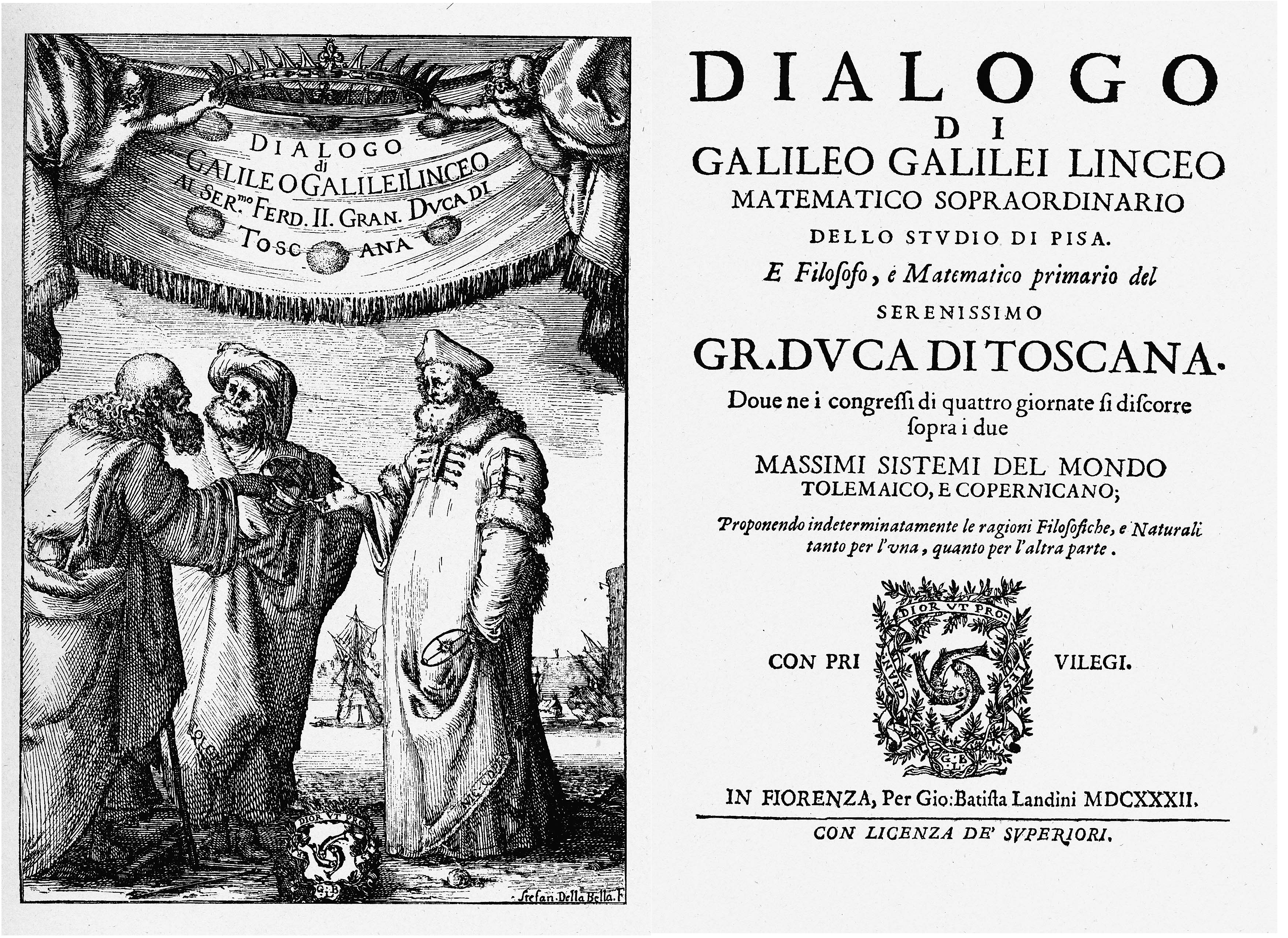
Galileo's champion-figure Salviati convinces Sagredo and defeats the Aristotelian Simplicio, in his 1632 Dialogue.

In the Early Modern period, Aristotle came to represent all that was obsolete, scholastic, and wrong, not helped by his association with medieval theology. In 1632, Galileo represented Aristotelianism in his Dialogo sopra i due massimi sistemi del mondo (Dialogue Concerning the Two Chief World Systems) by the strawman Simplicio ("Simpleton"). That same year, William Harvey proved Aristotle wrong by demonstrating that blood circulates.

Aristotle still represented the enemy of true science into the 20th century. Leroi noted that in 1985, Peter Medawar stated in "pure seventeenth century" tones that Aristotle had assembled "a strange and generally speaking rather tiresome farrago of hearsay, imperfect observation, wishful thinking and credulity amounting to downright gullibility".

=== 19th century revival ===
Zoologists working in the 19th century, including Georges Cuvier, Johannes Peter Müller, and Louis Agassiz admired Aristotle's biology and investigated some of his observations. D'Arcy Thompson translated History of Animals in 1910, making a classically educated zoologist's informed attempt to identify the animals that Aristotle names, and to interpret and diagram his anatomical descriptions.

Charles Darwin quoted a passage from Aristotle's Physics II 8 in The Origin of Species, which entertains the possibility of a selection process following the random combination of body parts. Darwin comments that "We here see the principle of natural selection shadowed forth". However, two things mitigate against this interpretation. Firstly, Aristotle immediately rejected the possibility of such a process of assembling body parts. Secondly, according to Leroi, Aristotle was in any case discussing ontogeny, the Empedoclean coming into being of an individual from component parts, not phylogeny and natural selection. Darwin considered Aristotle the most important early contributor to biological thought; in an 1882 letter he wrote that "Linnaeus and Cuvier have been my two gods, though in very different ways, but they were mere schoolboys to old Aristotle."

=== 20th and 21st century interest ===
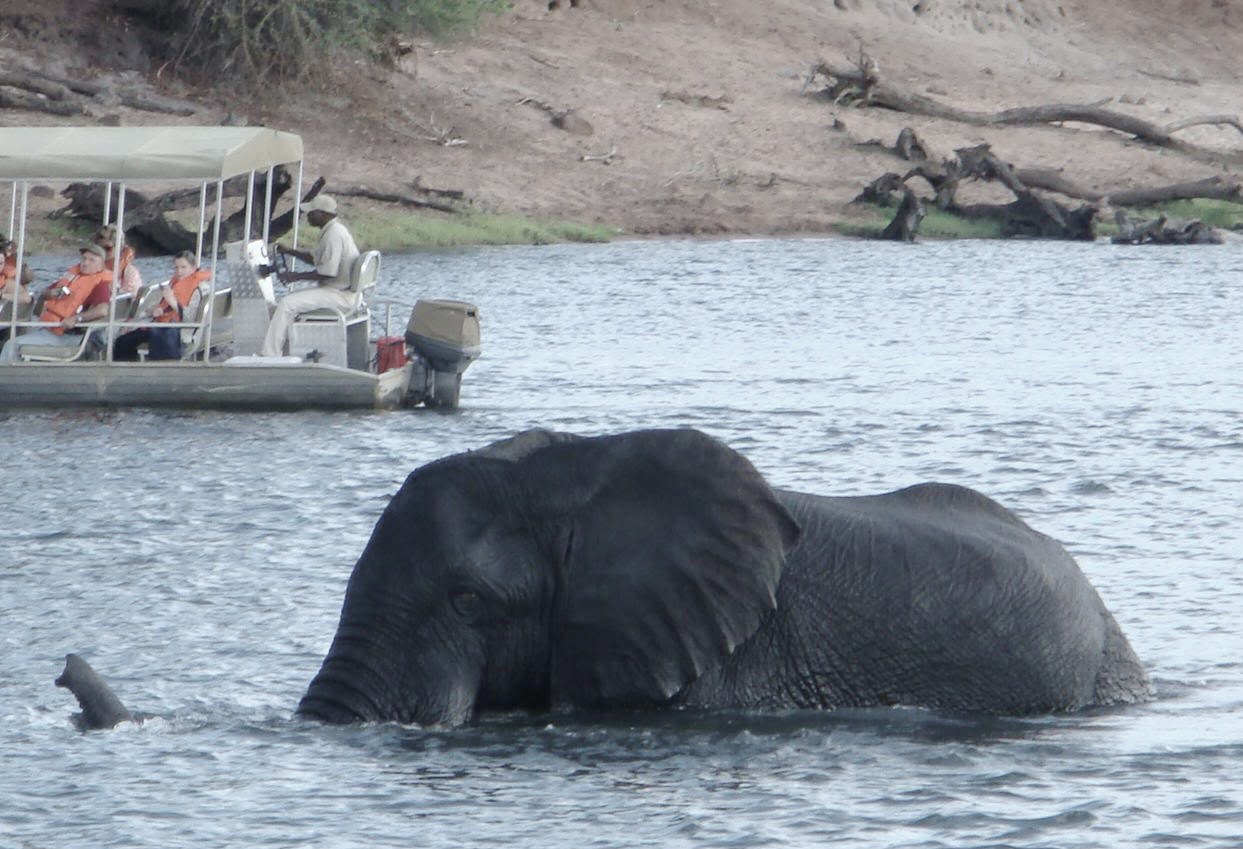
Elephant swimming, using its trunk as a snorkel, as Aristotle stated

Zoologists have frequently mocked Aristotle for errors and unverified secondhand reports. However, modern observation has confirmed one after another of his more surprising claims, including the active camouflage of the octopus and the ability of elephants to snorkel with their trunks while swimming.

Aristotle remains largely unknown to modern scientists, though zoologists are perhaps most likely to mention him as "the father of biology"; the MarineBio Conservation Society notes that he identified "crustaceans, echinoderms, mollusks, and fish", that cetaceans are mammals, and that marine vertebrates could be either oviparous or viviparous, so he "is often referred to as the father of marine biology". (Note: As a father to the science, he stands alone. The next figures significant enough to be named in MarineBio's history, for example, are Captain James Cook and Charles Darwin, some two millennia later.) Few practicing zoologists explicitly adhere to Aristotle's great chain of being, but its influence is still perceptible in the use of the terms "lower" and "upper" to designate taxa such as groups of plants. The evolutionary zoologist Armand Leroi has taken an interest in Aristotle's biology. (Note: Leroi has written several papers on the subject, cited in his book, and made a BBC film about it.) The concept of homology began with Aristotle, and the evolutionary developmental biologist Lewis I. Held commented that

The deep thinker who would be most amused by .. deep homologies is Aristotle, who was fascinated by the natural world but bewildered by its inner workings.

== Works ==
Aristotle did not write anything that resembles a modern, unified textbook of biology. Instead, he wrote a large number of "books" which, taken together, give an idea of his approach to the science. Some of these interlock, referring to each other, while others, such as the drawings of The Anatomies are lost, but referred to in the History of Animals, where the reader is instructed to look at the diagrams to understand how the animal parts described are arranged, and it has even been possible to reconstruct (admittedly with much associated uncertainty) what some of these illustrations may have looked like, from Aristotle's descriptions.

Aristotle's main biological works are the five books sometimes grouped as On Animals (De Animalibus), namely, with the conventional abbreviations shown in parentheses:

- History of Animals, or Inquiries into Animals (Historia Animalium) (HA)
- Generation of Animals (De Generatione Animalium) (GA)
- Movement of Animals (De Motu Animalium) (DM)
- Parts of Animals (De Partibus Animalium) (PA)
- Progression of Animals or On the Gait of Animals (De Incessu Animalium) (IA)

together with On the Soul (De Anima) (DA).

In addition, a group of seven short works, conventionally forming the Parva Naturalia ("Short treatises on Nature"), is also mainly biological:

- Sense and Sensibilia (Sense)
- On Memory
- On Sleep
- On Dreams
- On Divination in Sleep
- On Length and Shortness of Life
- On Youth, Old Age, Life and Death, and Respiration

== Sources ==
- Guthrie, W. K. C. (1981). A History of Greek Philosophy. Vol. 1. Cambridge University Press.
- Leroi, Armand Marie (2010). "Function and Constraint in Aristotle and Evolutionary Theory". In Föllinger, S. (ed.). Was ist 'Leben'? Aristoteles' Anschauungen zur Entstehung und Funktionsweise von Leben. Franz Steiner Verlag. pp. 261–284.
- Leroi, Armand Marie (2014). The Lagoon: How Aristotle Invented Science. Bloomsbury. ISBN 978-1-4088-3622-4.
- Mason, Stephen F. (1962) [1953]. A History of the Sciences. P. F. Collier. ISBN 0-02-093400-9.
- Mayr, Ernst (1985). The Growth of Biological Thought: Diversity, Evolution, and Inheritance. Harvard University Press. ISBN 978-0-674-36446-2.
- Ogilvie, Brian W. (2010). "Zoology". In Grafton, Anthony; Most, Glenn W.; Settis, Salvatore (eds.). The Classical Tradition. Harvard University Press. pp. 1000–1001. ISBN 978-0-674-07227-5.
- Singer, Charles (1931). A Short History of Biology. Oxford University Press.
- Taylor, Henry Osborn (1922). "Chapter 3: Aristotle's Biology". Greek Biology and Medicine. Archived from the original on 27 March 2006.
- Thompson, D'Arcy Wentworth (1910). "Historia animalium". In Ross, W. D.; Smith, J. A. (eds.). The works of Aristotle translated into English. Clarendon Press.
- Thompson, D'Arcy Wentworth (1913). On Aristotle as a biologist. Clarendon Press.
