= James of Douai =

French philosopher

James of Douai (French: Jacques de Douai, Latin: Jacobus de Duaco; fl. 1275) was a French philosopher who taught at the University of Paris.

James was a Master of Arts who wrote commentaries on Aristotle. He defended the freedom of philosophers to engage in speculation. In 1275, the papal legate Simon of Brion appointed him proctor of the Picard nation at the university. He was probably one of the targets of the Condemnation of 1277. It is possible that the philosopher is the same person as the James of Douai who was a monk at the Abbey of Saint Bertin from 1287 to 1311.

Two commentaries on Aristotle's Meteorology and Nicomachean Ethics were once attributed to James, but his authorship now doubted. The commentary on Meteorology does contain ideas similar to those in James's known commentary on On the Soul. He adhered to the Averroist doctrine that knowledge was the ultimate perfecter of humans. James wrote commentaries of the summa and quaestiones form on Aristotle's On Length and Shortness of Life, On Memory, On Sleep, Sense and Sensibilia, Physics, Prior Analytics and Posterior Analytics.
