= Sophonias =

Sophonias may refer to:

- Sophonias, Greco-Latin form of the name of the Hebrew religious leader Zephaniah (fl. c. 600 BC)
- Sophonias (commentator) (fl. c. 1300), commentator on Aristotle
