= Sophonias (commentator) =

Byzantine philosopher (13th-14th century)

Sophonias (Greek: Σοφονίας; fl. 13th–14th century) was a Byzantine monk who wrote commentaries or paraphrases of the works of Aristotle including De Anima, Sophistici Elenchi, Prior Analytics, and the Parva Naturalia, which are still extant. Little is known about Sophonias, except that he was probably the monk sent by Michael IX Palaiologos on an abortive mission to arrange a marriage between Michael and a western princess around 1295.

== Work ==
In his works Sophonias has interwoven the statements of Aristotle with the scholia of Michael of Ephesus. Some later manuscripts of the Parva Naturalia commentary ascribe the work to Themistius, but Sophonias' authorship, first proposed by Valentin Rose, may be regarded as certain, and the method of composition does not resemble Themistius' at all. Sophonias wrote paraphrases of Aristotle's Categories, Prior Analytics, Sophistici Elenchi, De Anima, De Memoria and De Somno. He considered innovative his practice of writing a running explanatory account of every passage in Aristotle, incorporating amplifications of Aristotle's paraphrasers or those critical remarks of the commentators that he thought necessary to understand the text. The value of the works of Sophonias is that they contain excerpts from the best of the earlier commentators.
