= On Breath =

Work traditionally ascribed to Aristotle

On Breath (Greek: Περὶ πνεύματος; Latin: De spiritu) is a philosophical treatise included in the Corpus Aristotelicum but usually regarded as spurious. Its opening sentence raises the question: "What is the mode of growth, and the mode of maintenance, of the natural (or 'connate': emphutos) vital spirit (pneuma)?"

== Authorship ==
Among the ancient catalogues of Aristotle's works, a work On Breath (but in three books, not one) is listed only by Ptolemy-el-Garib, and Pliny the Elder (N.H. XI.220) and Galen (De simpl. med. temp. et fac. V.9) are the first authors who appear to make reference to the treatise we possess. In modern times, its authenticity has been virtually unanimously rejected, although most or all of it has been acknowledged to be an early work of the Peripatetic school, possibly connected with Theophrastus, Strato of Lampsacus, or Erasistratus, and shedding light on Hellenistic medicine.

In 2008, however, Bos and Ferwerda published a commentary in which they maintain that On Breath is a genuine work of Aristotle whose doctrines respond to those of Plato's Timaeus and constitute an important part of Aristotle's philosophy of nature. They list a number of positions that On Breath defends such as that fish don't breathe because there is no air in water that Aristotle is known to have held. They also consider the position on the soul to be that of Aristotle.

== See also ==
- On Youth, Old Age, Life and Death, and Respiration
