= On Indivisible Lines =

Work traditionally ascribed to Aristotle

On Indivisible Lines (Greek Περὶ ἀτόμων γραμμῶν; Latin De Lineis Insecabilibus) is a short treatise attributed to Aristotle, but likely written by a member of the Peripatetic school some time before the 2nd century BC.

On Indivisible Lines seeks to refute Xenocrates' views on lines and minimal parts.

== See also ==
- Works of Aristotle by Bekker numbers
