= Parva Naturalia =

Aristotelian works

The Parva Naturalia (a conventional Latin title first used by Giles of Rome: "short works on nature") are a collection of seven works by Aristotle, which discuss natural phenomena involving the body and the soul. They form parts of Aristotle's biology. The individual works are as follows (with links to online English translations):

Bekker number	Work	Latin name
	Parva Naturalia ("Short Works on Nature")
436a	Sense and Sensibilia	De Sensu et Sensibilibus
449b	On Memory	De Memoria et Reminiscentia
453b	On Sleep	De Somno et Vigilia
458a	On Dreams	De Insomniis
462b	On Divination in Sleep	De Divinatione per Somnum
464b	On Length and Shortness of Life	De Longitudine et Brevitate Vitae
467b	On Youth, Old Age, Life and Death, and Respiration	De Juventute et Senectute, De; Vita et Morte, De Respiratione

== Editions ==
All the Parva Naturalia

- Aristote: Petits traités d'histoire naturelle (with French translation and brief notes), ed. René Mugnier, Collection Budé, 1953
- Aristotle: Parva Naturalia (with extensive commentary in English), ed. W. D. Ross, Oxford, 1955 (repr. 2000, ISBN 0-19-814108-4)
- Aristotelis Parva Naturalia Graece et Latine (with Latin translation and notes), ed. Paul Siwek, Rome: Desclée, 1963
- Parva Naturalia with On the Motion of Animals, tr. David Bolotin, Mercer University Press, 2021.
- Aristotle's Parva Naturalia Text, Translation, and Commentary, Ronald Polansky, De Gruyter, 2024.

Multiple treatises

- David Gallop, Aristotle on Sleep and Dreams: A Text and Translation with Introduction, Notes, and Glossary. Petersborough, Ontario: Broadview Press, 1990, ISBN 0-921149-60-3 (On Sleep, On Dreams, and On Divination in Sleep)
