= Eckart Schütrumpf =

American classicist (born 1939)

Eckart Schütrumpf (born 3 February 1939) is a professor of classics at the University of Colorado at Boulder and former professor of classics at the University of Cape Town. He is known for his work on political, ethical, rhetorical and poetic issues in Aristotle, Plato, Cicero, and other ancient writers. In 2005 he won a prestigious research prize from the Alexander von Humboldt Foundation for foreign scholars in the humanities. He is currently working on an edition of Aristotle's fragments (see Corpus Aristotelicum).

== Books ==
1. Die Bedeutung des Wortes ethos in der Poetik des Aristoteles, Marburger Philosophische Dissertation 1966, published in: "Zetemata", Monographien zur Klassischen Altertumswissenschaft, H. 49, 1970, VII, 147 pp. (Reviews in JSTOR here and here)
2. Die Analyse der polis durch Aristoteles, Marburger Habilitationsschrift 1976, published in: "Studien zur Antiken Philosophie", Heft 10, Amsterdam 1980, XV, 400 pp. ISBN 90-6032-118-9 (Reviews in JSTOR here and here)
3. Xenophon Poroi, Vorschläge zur Beschaffung von Geldmitteln oder Über die Staatseinkünfte, Einleitung, krit. Textausgabe, Übersetzung und Anmerkungen, in "Texte zur Forschung", Wissenschaftliche Buchgesellschaft, Darmstadt 1982, 129 pp., reprinted (with corrections) 1987.
4. Aristoteles Politik Buch I, übersetzt und erläutert, in: Aristoteles Werke in Deutscher Übersetzung Bd. 9, Teil I, Berlin - Darmstadt 1991, 390 pp.
5. Aristoteles Politik Buch II - III, übersetzt und erläutert, in: Aristoteles Werke in Deutscher Übersetzung Bd. 9, Teil II, Berlin - Darmstadt 1991, 590 pp. (Review of items 4 and 5 in JSTOR here.)
6. Aristoteles Politik Buch IV - VI, übersetzt und eingeleitet von Eckart Schütrumpf, erklärt von E. Schütrumpf und H.J. Gehrke, in: Aristoteles Werke in Deutscher Übersetzung Bd. 9, Teil III, Berlin - Darmstadt 1996, 670 pp.
7. Aristoteles Politik Buch VII - VIII, übersetzt und erläutert, in: Aristoteles Werke in Deutscher Übersetzung Bd. 9, Teil IV, 688 pp., Berlin (Akademie Verlag) - Darmstadt 2005 (on Google Books here) (The four-volume set of works on Aristotle's Politics have ISBN 3-05-000011-2.)
8. Eric Voegelin's Deutung der Aristotelischen Politik in Order and History, Occasional Papers XXIV, Eric-Voegelin-Archiv, München 2001, 89 pp.
