= On Youth, Old Age, Life and Death, and Respiration =

Treatise by Aristotle

On Youth, Old Age, Life and Death, and Respiration (Greek: Περὶ νεότητος καὶ γήρως, καὶ ζωῆς καὶ θανάτου, καὶ ἀναπνοῆς; Latin: De Juventute et Senectute, De Vita et Morte, De Respiratione) is one of the short treatises that make up Aristotle's Parva Naturalia.

== Structure and contents ==
=== Place in the Parva Naturalia ===
In comparison to the first five treatises of the Parva Naturalia, this one and On Length and Shortness of Life, while still dealing with natural phenomena involving the body and the soul, are "definitely biological rather than psychological." They are omitted from the Parva Naturalia commentary of Sophonias.

=== Title and divisions of the treatise ===
Modern editions divide the treatise into 27 chapters. The Bekker edition of Aristotle's works distinguished two works, De Senectute et Juventute (chapters 1-6), and De Respiratione (chapters 7-27, for this reason sometimes cited as De Respiratione, chapters 1-21). However, the manuscripts give no basis for this distinction, and the contents are not accurately described by these labels; youth and old age only come into focus as "part of the explanation of life as a whole" in chapter 24. The work may, instead, be considered as a single, unified treatise on life, death, and the functions necessary to life: nutrition and respiration. The title On Youth, Old Age, Life and Death, and Respiration, given in the Medieval manuscripts, derives from the treatise's opening words: "We must now treat of youth and old age and life and death. We must probably also at the same time state the causes of respiration as well, since in some cases living and the reverse depend on this." This statement explains how respiration is part of the more general subject of life and death. While De Vita et Morte might, then, seem to be a more satisfactory title for the work (and Ptolemy Chennus refers to the whole in this way), youth and old age are important aspects of the subject, because Aristotle's conception "is not of a constant, unvarying life" but of a life-cycle of natural development and decay.

=== The heart as the primary organ of soul ===
Aristotle begins by raising the question of the seat of life in the body ("while it is clear that [the soul's] essential reality cannot be corporeal, yet manifestly it must exist in some bodily part which must be one of those possessing control over the members") and arrives at the answer that the heart is the primary organ of soul, and the central organ of nutrition and sensation (with which the organs of the five senses communicate). The motivation for this "disappointing feature of Aristotle's physiology" is a matter of conjecture; the importance of the brain had been suggested before Aristotle by Alcmaeon of Croton (on the basis of "the fact...that the end-organs of smell and sight are connected with the brain," with which Aristotle was familiar), and this had been accepted in turn by Diogenes of Apollonia, Democritus, and Plato.

=== Heart and lungs ===
Aristotle's account of the heart provides one of the clearest indications that he was familiar with the medical theories of some parts of the Hippocratic Corpus. Among other debts, "his comparison of the heart-lung system to a double bellows (ch. 26, 480a20-23) is clearly borrowed from the earlier treatise" On Regimen (De Victu). That is, the heart ("hot substance" in animals) is inside the lungs ("the primary organ of cooling," a function also served by gills); the heart expands under the influence of heat, forcing the lungs to expand under the same influence, causing inhalation, and this introduction of cold air from outside in turn causes contraction and exhalation. In this continuous process, "life and respiration are inseparable."

=== The life-cycle ===
Chapter 24 of the treatise gives several definitions that summarize Aristotle's theory.

generation (birth)	the initial participation in the nutritive soul, mediated by warm substance (i.e., in animals, the heart, in which the nutritive soul is incorporated)
life	the maintenance of this participation
youth	the period of the growth of the primary organ of refrigeration (the lungs)
the prime of life	the intervening time between the growth and decay of the primary organ of refrigeration
old age	the decay of the primary organ of refrigeration
violent death or dissolution	the extinction or exhaustion of the vital heat
natural death	the exhaustion of the heat owing to lapse of time, and occurring at the end of life
death, in old age	the exhaustion due to inability on the part of the organ, owing to old age, to produce refrigeration

=== Respiration ===
Respiration is the process by which breathing helps to cool and moderate the inner vital heat (thermotēta psychikēs) held in the heart.

"We have said before that life and the possession of heat depend upon some degree of heat; for digestion, by which animals assimilate their food, cannot take place apart from the soul and heat; for all food is rendered digestible by fire." 474a25-27.

Aristotle explains that if there is an excess of heat created in the heart the animal will "burn out" by excessively consuming the power sustaining its life (474b10-24). Its heat must be kindled (474b13) and in order to preserve (sōtērias) life, a cooling must take place (katapsyxis) (474b23).

While all animals need both food and cooling (476a16), only those with lungs require breathing. Fish and insects cool by different means (e.g. gills or buzzing). Fish use the water to cool, and this occurs in the gills, Aristotle thinks (478a34).

"animals higher in the scale of creation have more heat...they must at the same time have a higher form of soul, so they have a higher nature than that of fish." 477a18.

Aristotle also says that warmer animals require more cooling (478a23).

== Commentaries ==
- Michael of Ephesus, CAG XXII.1 (Greek text)
- W. D. Ross, Aristotle: Parva Naturalia, Oxford, 1955
