= On Things Heard =

Work formerly attributed to Aristotle

On Things Heard (Greek Περὶ ἀκουστῶν; Latin De audibilibus) is a work which was formerly attributed to Aristotle, but is now generally believed to be the work of Strato of Lampsacus. Our extant version of On Things Heard is made up of long extracts included in Porphyry's Commentary on Ptolemy's Harmonics, and is thus partial. The extracts are concerned with the nature of sound production.

== See also ==
- Corpus Aristotelicum
