= Physiognomonics =

Treatise attributed to Aristotle

Physiognomonics (Greek: Φυσιογνωμονικά; Latin: Physiognomonica) is an Ancient Greek pseudo-Aristotelian treatise on physiognomy attributed to Aristotle (and part of the Corpus Aristotelicum). It is a Peripatetic work, dated to the 4th/3rd century BC.

== Ancient physiognomy before the Physiognomonics ==
Although Physiognomonics is the earliest work surviving in Greek devoted to the subject, texts preserved on clay tablets provide evidence of physiognomy manuals from the First Babylonian dynasty, containing divinatory case studies of the ominous significance of various bodily dispositions. At this point physiognomy is "a specific, already theorized, branch of knowledge" and the heir of a long-developed technical tradition.

While loosely physiognomic ways of thinking are present in Greek literature as early as Homer, physiognomy proper is not known before the classical period. The term physiognomonia first appears in the fifth-century BC Hippocratic treatise Epidemics (II.5.1). Physiognomy was mentioned in a work by Antisthenes on the Sophists, which provides evidence of its recognition as an art (techne).

In Aristotle's time, physiognomics was acknowledged as an art (techne) with its own skilled practitioners (technitai), as we see from a reference in Generation of Animals (IV.3):

Then people say that the child has the head of a ram or a bull, and so on with other animals, as that a calf has the head of a child or a sheep that of an ox. All these monsters result from the causes stated above, but they are none of the things they are said to be; there is only some similarity, such as may arise even where there is no defect of growth. Hence often jesters compare someone who is not beautiful to a goat breathing fire, or again to a ram butting, and a certain physiognomist reduced all faces to those of two or three animals, and his arguments often prevailed on people. (trans. Pratt rev. Barnes)

Already in antiquity, physiognomy's pretensions to a "scientific" foundation were questioned and debated. It had connections to medicine, but also to magic and divination.

== The treatise ==
=== Structure and content ===
The treatise is divided into sections on theory (805a1-808b10) and method (808b11-814b9). The connections between bodily features and character are treated in detail, cataloguing, for example, twelve kinds of nose, and the distinctive features of the cinaedus.

=== Connections to Aristotle ===
The pseudo-Aristotelian treatise begins with an allusion to Aristotle's Prior Analytics (II.27, on the body-soul correlation), and many of the physiognomic connections discussed are mentioned specifically in the History of Animals.

=== Influence ===
The author's systematic scheme of physiognomic relationships was not adopted by later writers on the subject; the proliferation of incompatible teachings had "the cumulative effect of undermining the authority of the profession as a whole."
