= On Ideas =

Work attributed to Aristotle

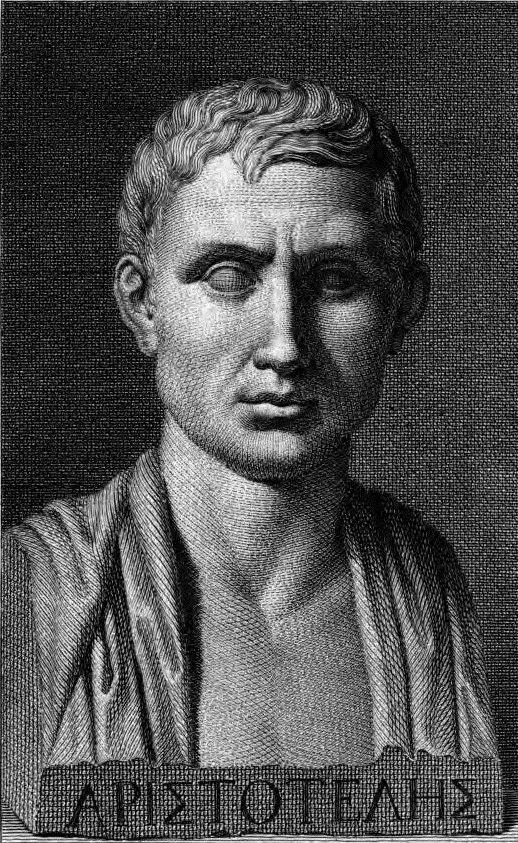
Bust of Aristotle

On Ideas (Greek: Περὶ Ἰδεῶν, Peri Ideōn) is a philosophical work which deals with the problem of universals with regard to Plato's Theory of Forms. The work is supposedly by Aristotle, but there is not universal agreement on this point. It only survives now as fragments in quotations by Alexander of Aphrodisias in his commentary on Aristotle's Metaphysics.

== Summary ==
On Ideas gives greater detail to many of the arguments which Aristotle recounts in Metaphysics A.9. There and here objections to arguments for Plato's Theory of Forms are given. A point made in multiple places is that the Platonist arguments establish only that there are universals in a general and metaphysically slim sense, and not there are full-blown Forms of the Platonic kind. A version of the third man argument is also given.

== Authenticity ==
Alexander of Aphrodisias does attribute his quotations which form the extant text of On Ideas to Aristotle. The content also matches with what Aristotle says of the Platonist arguments in his Metaphysics. However, the external evidence that On Ideas is an authentic work of Aristotle is ambiguous and its status as such is not universally recognized.

== Text and translations ==
The full Greek text of Alexander's commentary which includes On Ideas is published in the first volume of the Commentaria in Aristotelem Graeca. Excerpts from this, along with an English translation and commentary by Gail Fine, are available in On Ideas: Aristotle's Criticism of Plato's Theory of Forms published by the Oxford University Press in 1993. This translation is also reproduced with notes in Aristotle: Selections, edited by Terence Irwin and Gail Fine and published by Hackett Publishing in 1995.
