= Rhetoric to Alexander =

Work traditionally attributed to Aristotle

The Rhetoric to Alexander (also widely known by its title in Latin: Rhetorica ad Alexandrum; Ancient Greek: Τέχνη ῥητορική) is a treatise traditionally attributed to Aristotle. It is now generally believed to be the work of Anaximenes of Lampsacus.

== Authorship ==
Quintilian seems to refer to this work under Anaximenes' name in Institutio Oratoria, as the Italian Renaissance philologist Piero Vettori first recognized. This attribution has been disputed by some scholars however.

== Content ==
As a complete Greek manual on rhetoric still extant from the fourth century BCE, Rhetoric to Alexander gives us an invaluable look into the rhetorical theory of the time. Aristotle did in fact write a work On Rhetoric at much the same time. The author claims to have based this treatise on the Techne of Corax and the Theodectea of Aristotle which may in fact refer to On Rhetoric seeing that Aristotle's work was not published until 83 BCE. The teaching of Aristotle on the matter was made available during his lectures and his lecturing notes was preserved after his death by his pupil, Theophrastus.

The structure of Rhetoric to Alexander is quite similar to that of Aristotle's work. Chapters 1-5 deal with arguments specific to each of the species of rhetoric corresponding to the first book of Aristotle's work. Chapters 6-22 are about "uses" what Aristotle calls "topics", discussing them in the latter part of his second book. Chapters 23-28 discuss style which Aristotle discusses in the first half of his third book. And chapters 29-37 finally treat arrangement as discussed by Aristotle in the latter part of his third book. From this it is clear that both the Rhetoric to Alexander and Aristotle's On Rhetoric were using a structure common to rhetorical handbooks of the fourth century.

In contrast to Aristotle, the author of Rhetoric to Alexander does not use examples illustrating his precepts. Because this treatise differs from Aristotle in some details it is sometimes thought to have stood in the tradition surrounding the person of Isocrates, but there is no clear evidence for this. The treatise Rhetoric to Alexander does not seem to have made a big impact on rhetorical studies at the time and is not often heard of afterwards. It only survived because it was thought to have been written by Aristotle.

== See also ==
- Rhetoric (Aristotle)
- Rhetorica ad Herennium
