= Richard Rudolf Walzer =

Anglo-German philologist and philosopher (1900–1975)

Richard Rudolf Walzer, FBA (14 July 1900 in Berlin – 16 April 1975 in Oxford) was a German-born British scholar of Greek philosophy and of Arabic philosophy.

Education: Werner-Siemens-Realgymnasium, Berlin-Schöneberg; Frederick William University of Berlin.

== Career ==
- Assistant (1927), Privatdocent in Classics (1932), Frederick William University of Berlin, 1927–1933
- Lecturer in Greek Philosophy, University of Rome, 1933–1938
- Lecturer in Mediaeval Philosophy (Arabic and Hebrew) (1942), Senior Lecturer in Arabic and Greek Philosophy (1950), Oriel College, Oxford, 1942–1962
- Honorary Professor, University of Hamburg, 1952
- Member, Institute for Advanced Study, Princeton, New Jersey, 1953–1954
- Fellow, Reader in Arabic and Greek Philosophy St Catherine's College, Oxford, 1962–1970
- He was elected a Fellow of the British Academy in 1956.

== Publications ==
- Walzer, Richard (1949). Galen on Jews and Christians. London: Oxford University Press.
- Walzer, Richard (1962). Greek into Arabic : essays on Islamic philosophy. Oxford: B. Cassirer.
- Farabi (1985). Walzer, Richard (ed.). Al-farabi on the perfect State : Abu Nasr al-Farabi's mabadi' Ara' ahl al-madina al-fadila. Oxford: Clarendon Press.

=== Festschrift ===
- Stern, S.M.; Hourani, Albert; Brown, Vivian, eds. (1972). Islamic philosophy and the classical tradition : essays presented by his friends and pupils to Richard Walzer on his seventieth birthday. Oxford: B. Cassirer.
