= Progression of Animals =

Work by Aristotle

Progression of Animals (or On the Gait of Animals; Greek: Περὶ πορείας ζῴων; Latin: De incessu animalium) is one of Aristotle's major texts on biology. It gives details of gait and movement in various kinds of animals, as well as speculating over the structural homologies among living things.

Aristotle sets out to "discuss the parts which are useful to animals for their movement from place to place, and consider why each part is of the nature which it is, and why they possess them, and further the differences in the various parts of one and the same animal and in those of animals of different species compared with one another" (704a1-4). Progression of Animals illustrates Aristotle's teleological approach to animal biology.

== Texts and translations ==
- Works related to On the Progression of Animals at Wikisource
- Greek text and English translation by E.S. Forster (Loeb Classical Library, Aristotle Parts of Animals, Movement of Animals, Progression of Animals, 1937): archive.org
- On the Gait of Animals, translated by A. S. L. Farquharson, Oxford, 1912: Google Books, Adelaide (HTML), MIT Classics (HTML)
- Movement & Progression of Animals public domain audiobook at LibriVox
- Greek text with Farquharson's translation facing
- Greek text with French translation and commentary by Jules Barthélemy-Saint-Hilaire
