= On Divination in Sleep =

Work by Aristotle

On Divination in Sleep (or On Prophesying by Dreams; Ancient Greek: Περὶ τῆς καθ᾽ ὕπνον μαντικῆς; Latin: De divinatione per somnum) is a text by Aristotle in which he discusses precognitive dreams.

The treatise, one of the Parva Naturalia, is an early inquiry (perhaps the first formal one) into this phenomenon. In his skeptical consideration of such dreams, Aristotle argues that, although "the senders of such dreams should be the gods," it is nonetheless the case "that those to whom they are sent are not the best and wisest, but merely commonplace persons" (i, 462b20-22). Thus, "Most [so-called prophetic] dreams are, however, to be classed as mere coincidences" (i, 463a31-b1).
