= On Dreams =

Work by Aristotle

On Dreams (Ancient Greek: Περὶ ἐνυπνίων; Latin: De insomniis) is one of the short treatises that make up Aristotle's Parva Naturalia.

The short text is divided into three chapters. In the first, Aristotle tries to determine whether dreams "pertain to the faculty of thought or to that of sense-perception." In the second chapter, he considers the circumstances of sleep and how the sense organs operate. Finally, in the third chapter he explains how dreams are caused, proposing that it is the residual movements of the sensory organs that allow them to arise.

== Content ==
Aristotle explains that during sleep there is an absence of external sensory stimulation. While sleeping with our eyes closed, the eyes are unable to see, and so in this respect we perceive nothing while asleep. He compares hallucinations to dreams, saying "...the faculty by which, in waking hours, we are subject to illusion when affected by disease, is identical with that which produces illusory effects in sleep." When awake and perceiving, to see or hear something incorrectly only occurs when one actually sees or hears something, thinking it to be something else. But in sleep, if it is still true that one does not see, hear, or experience sense perception in the normal way, then the faculty of sense, he reasons, must be affected in some different way.

Ultimately, Aristotle concludes that dreaming is due to residual movements of the sensory organs. Some dreams, he says, may even be caused by indigestion:

We must suppose that, like the little eddies which are formed in rivers, so the movements are each a continuous process, often remaining like what they were when first started, but often, too, broken, into other forms by collisions with obstacles. This gives the reason why no dreams occur in sleep after meals, or to sleepers who are extremely young, e.g., to infants. The movement in such cases is excessive, owing to the heat generated from the food. Hence, just as in a liquid, if one vehemently disturbs it, sometimes no reflected image appears, while at other times one appears, indeed, but utterly distorted, so as to seem quite unlike its original; while, when once the motion has ceased, the reflected images are clear and plain; in the same manner during sleep the images, or residuary images are clear and plain; in the same manner during sleep the images, or residuary movements, which are based upon the sensory impressions, become sometimes quite obliterated by the above described motion when too violent; while at other times the sights are indeed seen, but confused and weird, and the dreams are incoherent, like those of persons who are atrabilious, or feverish, or intoxicated with wine. For all such affections, being spirituous, cause much commotion and disturbance.

Aristotle also describes the phenomenon of lucid dreaming, whereby the dreamer becomes aware that he is dreaming.

== Legacy ==
The 17th century English philosopher Thomas Hobbes generally adopted Aristotle's view that dreams arise from continued movements of the sensory organs during sleep, writing that "dreams are caused by the distemper of some inward parts of the Body." He thought this explanation would further help in understanding different types of dreams, for example, "lying cold breedeth Dreams of Feare, and raiseth the thought and Image of some fearfull object."

The neurologist Sigmund Freud cited Aristotle in his 1899 work, The Interpretation of Dreams, as the first to recognize that dreams "do not arise from supernatural manifestations but follow the laws of the human spirit." He held Aristotle's definition of dreams to be "the mental activity of the sleeper in so far as he is asleep."
