= On Sleep =

Work by Aristotle

On Sleep (or On Sleep and Sleeplessness; Greek Περὶ ὕπνου καὶ ἐγρηγόρσεως; Latin: De somno et vigilia) is a text by Aristotle, one of the Parva Naturalia.

== Topics ==
=== The common sense ===
"In another place it has been laid down that sense-perception originates in the same part of an animal's body as movement does...In sanguineous animals this is the region about the heart; for all sanguineous animals possess a heart, and both movement and the dominant sense-perception originate there. as for movement, it is clear that breathing and in general the process of cooling takes its rise here, and that nature has supplied both breathing and the power of cooling by moisture with a view to the conservation of the heat in that part. We will discuss this later on. In bloodless animals and insects and creatures which do not respire, the naturally inherent breath is seen expanding and contraction in the part which corresponds to the heart in other animals" (456a1-13).

"Since it is impossible to make any movement, or do any action without strength, and the holding of the breath produces strength" (456a17).
