= On Memory =

Work by Aristotle

On Memory (Greek: Περὶ μνήμης καὶ ἀναμνήσεως; Latin: De memoria et reminiscentia) is one of the short treatises that make up Aristotle's Parva Naturalia. It is frequently published together, and read together, with Aristotle's De Anima.

== Editions ==
- Richard Sorabji, Aristotle On Memory, second edition, Chicago: University of Chicago Press, 2006, ISBN 0-226-76823-6 (review)
- David Bloch, Aristotle on Memory and Recollection: Text, Translation, Interpretation, and Reception in Western Scholasticism, Leiden: Brill, 2007, ISBN 978-90-04-16046-0 (review)
