= Sense and Sensibilia (Aristotle) =

Short treatises by Aristotle

Sense and Sensibilia (Latin: De sensu et sensibilibus) is a short treatise by Aristotle on sense-perception and the objects of sense. In the traditional arrangement of the Aristotelian corpus it stands at the head of the Parva naturalia and marks the transition from the investigation of the soul in De anima to the study of activities shared by body and soul in living things.

At the beginning of the treatise Aristotle says that, having already discussed the soul and its faculties, he will turn to animals and other living things and examine the activities that are peculiar to some and common to others. In standard editions this makes Sense and Sensibilia the first work in a sequence followed by On Memory and Recollection, On Sleep and Waking, On Dreams, On Divination in Sleep, On Length and Shortness of Life, On Youth and Old Age, On Life and Death and On Respiration. Because it links questions about perception to physiology, the treatise also became important to later discussions of the relation between natural philosophy and medicine.

== Contents ==
The opening chapters connect the senses to animal life. Aristotle argues that touch and taste belong to all animals, while sight, hearing and smell chiefly help animals capable of locomotion to seek food and avoid harm. He then turns to the bodily organs of perception, rejecting emission theories of vision associated with Empedocles and maintaining that the eye sees not because it contains fire, but because it is a transparent organ whose matter is chiefly water.

Much of the treatise is devoted to the proper sensibles. In the discussion of colour Aristotle relates light to the transparent and treats colour as located at the boundary of visible bodies. He also develops a theory of intermediate colours in which they arise through the mixture of black and white bodies rather than by simple juxtaposition, a passage later connected by commentators with his wider theory of mixture.

The chapters on taste and smell emphasize the parallel between savour and odour. Aristotle explains taste through the action of the dry and earthy on the moist, and he argues that odour exists in both air and water, since fish and other aquatic animals can perceive it. In his treatment of smell he places it between the contact senses and the distance senses, because its object is related both to nutritive bodies and to media such as air and water. The later sections ask why sensible qualities have only a limited number of species and whether several sensibles can be perceived at the same time. These final discussions made De sensu especially important in later debates on common sensibles and common sense.

== Transmission and reception ==
De sensu et sensibilibus was transmitted with the other short physiological treatises in Greek and Latin manuscript traditions, although the order of the works was not always fixed and some treatises circulated in grouped units. Ancient catalogues already treated it as a distinct book on sense-perception and sense objects, and medieval readers commonly approached it as an immediate sequel to De anima.

The treatise generated a long commentary tradition. Alexander of Aphrodisias wrote the earliest surviving Greek commentary on it; Michael of Ephesus later commented on the Parva naturalia in Byzantium; and in the Latin West the text was studied by writers including Thomas Aquinas. Material from De sensu also circulated in Arabic adaptations and commentaries, extending its influence beyond Greek and Latin Aristotelianism. A sentence in the first chapter contrasting natural philosophers and physicians was repeatedly cited in Renaissance universities and eventually condensed into the maxim ubi desinit physicus, ibi medicus incipit ("where the natural philosopher ends, there the physician begins").
