= On Length and Shortness of Life =

Work by Aristotle

On Length and Shortness of Life (or On Longevity and Shortness of Life; Greek: Περὶ μακροβιότητος καὶ βραχυβιότητος; Latin: De longitudine et brevitate vitae) is a text by the Ancient Greek philosopher Aristotle and one of the Parva Naturalia.
