= Aristotelian physics =

Natural sciences as described by Aristotle

Aristotelian physics is the form of natural philosophy described in the works of the Greek philosopher Aristotle (384–322 BC). In his work Physics, Aristotle intended to establish general principles of change that govern all natural bodies, both living and inanimate, celestial and terrestrial – including all motion (change with respect to place), quantitative change (change with respect to size or number), qualitative change, and substantial change ("coming to be" [coming into existence, 'generation'] or "passing away" [no longer existing, 'corruption']). To Aristotle, 'physics' was a broad field including subjects which would now be called the philosophy of mind, sensory experience, memory, anatomy and biology. It constitutes the foundation of the thought underlying many of his works.

Key concepts of Aristotelian physics include the structuring of the cosmos into concentric spheres, with the Earth at the centre and celestial spheres around it. The terrestrial sphere was made of four elements, namely earth, air, fire, and water, subject to change and decay. The celestial spheres were made of a fifth element, an unchangeable aether. Objects made of these elements have natural motions: those of earth and water tend to fall; those of air and fire, to rise. The speed of such motion depends on their weights and the density of the medium. Aristotle argued that a vacuum could not exist as speeds would become infinite.

Aristotle described four causes or explanations of change as seen on earth: the material, formal, efficient, and final causes of things. As regards living things, Aristotle's biology relied on observation of what he considered to be ‘natural kinds’, both those he considered basic and the groups to which he considered these belonged. He did not conduct experiments in the modern sense, but relied on amassing data, observational procedures such as dissection, and making hypotheses about relationships between measurable quantities such as body size and lifespan.

== Methods ==
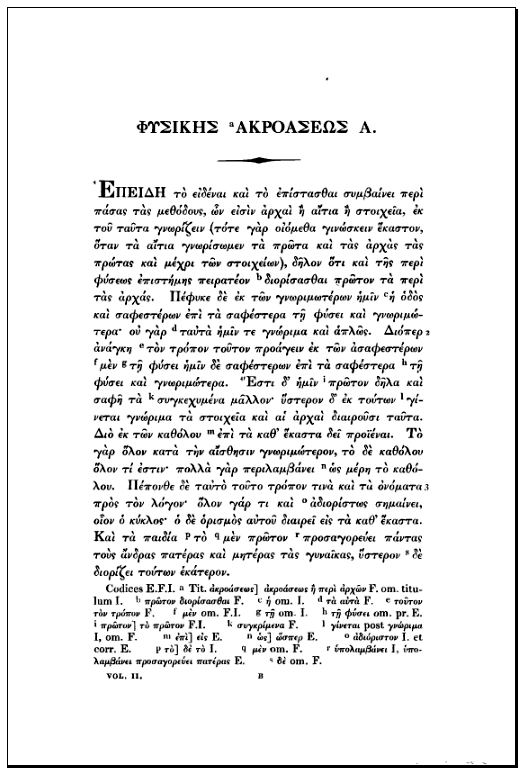
A page from an 1837 edition of the ancient Greek philosopher Aristotle's Physica, a book addressing a variety of subjects including the philosophy of nature and topics now part of its modern-day namesake: physics.

nature is everywhere the cause of order.

— Aristotle, Physics VIII.1

While consistent with common human experience, Aristotle's principles were not based on controlled, quantitative experiments, so they do not describe our universe in the precise, quantitative way now expected of science. Contemporaries of Aristotle like Aristarchus rejected these principles in favor of heliocentrism, but their ideas were not widely accepted. Aristotle's principles were difficult to disprove merely through casual everyday observation, but later development of the scientific method challenged his views with experiments and careful measurement, using increasingly advanced technology such as the telescope and vacuum pump.

In claiming novelty for their doctrines, those natural philosophers who developed the "new science" of the seventeenth century frequently contrasted "Aristotelian" physics with their own. Physics of the former sort, so they claimed, emphasized the qualitative at the expense of the quantitative, neglected mathematics and its proper role in physics (particularly in the analysis of local motion), and relied on such suspect explanatory principles as final causes and "occult" essences. Yet in his Physics Aristotle characterizes physics or the "science of nature" as pertaining to magnitudes (megethê), motion (or "process" or "gradual change" – kinêsis), and time (chronon) (Phys III.4 202b30–1). Indeed, the Physics is largely concerned with an analysis of motion, particularly local motion, and the other concepts that Aristotle believes are requisite to that analysis.

— Michael J. White, "Aristotle on the Infinite, Space, and Time" in Blackwell Companion to Aristotle

There are clear differences between modern and Aristotelian physics, the main being the use of mathematics, largely absent in Aristotle. Some recent studies, however, have re-evaluated Aristotle's physics, stressing both its empirical validity and its continuity with modern physics.

== Concepts ==
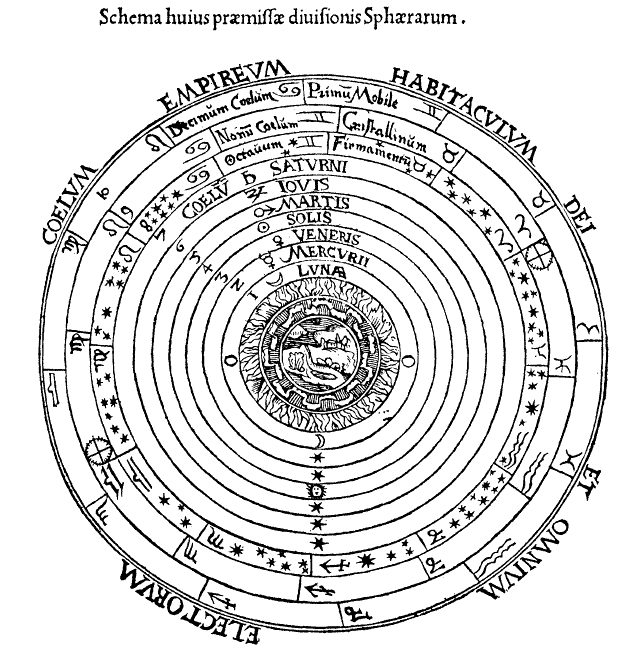
Peter Apian's 1524 representation of the universe, heavily influenced by Aristotle's ideas. The terrestrial spheres of water and earth (shown in the form of continents and oceans) are at the center of the universe, immediately surrounded by the spheres of air, and then fire, where meteorites and comets were believed to originate. The surrounding celestial spheres, from inner to outer, are those of the Moon, Mercury, Venus, Sun, Mars, Jupiter, and Saturn, each indicated by a planet symbol. The eighth sphere is the firmament of fixed stars, which include the visible constellations. The precession of the equinoxes caused a gap between the visible and notional divisions of the zodiac, so medieval Christian astronomers created a ninth sphere, the Crystallinum, which holds an unchanging version of the zodiac. The tenth sphere is that of the divine prime mover proposed by Aristotle (though each sphere would have an unmoved mover). Above that, Christian theology placed the "Empire of God." What this diagram does not show is how Aristotle explained the complicated curves that the planets make in the sky. To preserve the principle of perfect circular motion, he proposed that each planet was moved by several nested spheres, with the poles of each connected to the next outermost, but with axes of rotation offset from each other. Though Aristotle left the number of spheres open to empirical determination, he proposed adding to the many-sphere models of previous astronomers, resulting in a total of 44 or 55 celestial spheres.

=== Elements and spheres ===
Aristotle divided his universe into "terrestrial spheres" which were "corruptible" and where humans lived, and moving but otherwise unchanging celestial spheres.

Aristotle believed that four classical elements make up everything in the terrestrial spheres: earth, air, fire and water.^{[a]} He also held that the heavens are made of a special weightless and incorruptible (i.e. unchangeable) fifth element called "aether." Aether also has the name "quintessence", meaning, literally, "fifth being."

Aristotle considered heavy matter such as iron and other metals to consist primarily of the element earth, with a smaller amount of the other three terrestrial elements. Other, lighter objects, he believed, have less earth, relative to the other three elements in their composition.

The four classical elements were not invented by Aristotle; they were originated by Empedocles. During the Scientific Revolution, the ancient theory of classical elements was eventually replaced by the empirically tested concept of chemical elements.

==== Celestial spheres ====
According to Aristotle, the Sun, Moon, planets and stars – are embedded in perfectly concentric "crystal spheres" that rotate eternally at fixed rates. Because the celestial spheres are incapable of any change except rotation, the terrestrial sphere of fire must account for the heat, starlight and occasional meteorites. The lowest, lunar sphere is the only celestial sphere that actually comes in contact with the sublunary orb's changeable, terrestrial matter, dragging the rarefied fire and air along underneath as it rotates. Like Homer's æthere (αἰθήρ) – the "pure air" of Mount Olympus – was the divine counterpart of the air breathed by mortal beings (άήρ, aer). The celestial spheres are composed of the special element aether, eternal and unchanging, the sole capability of which is a uniform circular motion at a given rate (relative to the diurnal motion of the outermost sphere of fixed stars).

The concentric, aetherial, cheek-by-jowl "crystal spheres" that carry the Sun, Moon and stars move eternally with unchanging circular motion. Spheres are embedded within spheres to account for the "wandering stars" (i.e. the planets, which, in comparison with the Sun, Moon and stars, appear to move erratically). Mercury, Venus, Mars, Jupiter, and Saturn are the only planets (including minor planets) which were visible before the invention of the telescope, which is why Neptune and Uranus are not included, nor are any asteroids. Later, the belief that all spheres are concentric was forsaken in favor of Ptolemy's deferent and epicycle model. Aristotle submits to the calculations of astronomers regarding the total number of spheres and various accounts give a number in the neighborhood of fifty spheres. An unmoved mover is assumed for each sphere, including a "prime mover" for the sphere of fixed stars. The unmoved movers do not push the spheres (nor could they, being immaterial and dimensionless) but are the final cause of the spheres' motion, i.e. they explain it in a way that's similar to the explanation "the soul is moved by beauty."

=== Terrestrial change ===
The four terrestrial elements

Unlike the eternal and unchanging celestial aether, each of the four terrestrial elements are capable of changing into either of the two elements they share a property with: e.g. the cold and wet (water) can transform into the hot and wet (air) or the cold and dry (earth). Any apparent change from cold and wet into the hot and dry (fire) is actually a two-step process, as first one of the property changes, then the other. These properties are predicated of an actual substance relative to the work it is able to do; that of heating or chilling and of desiccating or moistening. The four elements exist only with regard to this capacity and relative to some potential work. The celestial element is eternal and unchanging, so only the four terrestrial elements account for "coming to be" and "passing away" – or, in the terms of Aristotle's On Generation and Corruption (Περὶ γενέσεως καὶ φθορᾶς), "generation" and "corruption."

=== Natural place ===
The Aristotelian explanation of gravity is that all bodies move toward their natural place. For the elements earth and water, that place is the center of the (geocentric) universe; the natural place of water is a concentric shell around the Earth because earth is heavier; it sinks in water. The natural place of air is likewise a concentric shell surrounding that of water; bubbles rise in water. Finally, the natural place of fire is higher than that of air but below the innermost celestial sphere (carrying the Moon).

In Book Delta of his Physics (IV.5), Aristotle defines topos (place) in terms of two bodies, one of which contains the other: a "place" is where the inner surface of the former (the containing body) touches the contained body. This definition remained dominant until the beginning of the 17th century, even though it had been questioned and debated by philosophers since antiquity. The most significant early critique was made in terms of geometry by the 11th-century Arab polymath al-Hasan Ibn al-Haytham (Alhazen) in his Discourse on Place.

=== Natural motion ===
Terrestrial objects rise or fall, to a greater or lesser extent, according to the ratio of the four elements of which they are composed. For example, earth, the heaviest element, and water, fall toward the center of the cosmos; hence the Earth and for the most part its oceans, will have already come to rest there. At the opposite extreme, the lightest elements, air and especially fire, rise up and away from the center.

The elements are not proper substances in Aristotelian theory (or the modern sense of the word). Instead, they are abstractions used to explain the varying natures and behaviors of actual materials in terms of ratios between them.

Motion and change are closely related in Aristotelian physics. Motion, according to Aristotle, involved a change from potentiality to actuality. He gave example of four types of change, namely change in substance, in quality, in quantity and in place.

Aristotle's laws of motion. In Physics he states that objects fall at a speed proportional to their weight and inversely proportional to the density of the fluid they are immersed in. This is a correct approximation for objects in Earth's gravitational field moving in air or water.

Aristotle proposed that the speed at which two identically shaped objects sink or fall is directly proportional to their weights and inversely proportional to the density of the medium through which they move. While describing their terminal velocity, Aristotle must stipulate that there would be no limit at which to compare the speed of atoms falling through a vacuum, (they could move indefinitely fast because there would be no particular place for them to come to rest in the void). Now however it is understood that at any time prior to achieving terminal velocity in a relatively resistance-free medium like air, two such objects are expected to have nearly identical speeds because both are experiencing a force of gravity proportional to their masses and have thus been accelerating at nearly the same rate. This became especially apparent from the eighteenth century when partial vacuum experiments began to be made, but some two hundred years earlier Galileo had already demonstrated that objects of different weights reach the ground in similar times.

=== Unnatural motion ===
Apart from the natural tendency of terrestrial exhalations to rise and objects to fall, unnatural or forced motion from side to side results from the turbulent collision and sliding of the objects as well as transmutation between the elements (On Generation and Corruption). Aristotle phrased this principle as: "Everything that moves is moved by something else. (Omne quod movetur ab alio movetur.)" When the cause ceases, so does the effect. The cause, according to Aristotle, must be a power (i.e., force) that drives the body as long as the external agent remains in direct contact. Aristotle went on to say that the velocity of the body is directly proportional to the force imparted and inversely proportional to the resistance of the medium in which the motion takes place. This gives the law in today's notation

$\text{velocity} \propto\frac{\text{imparted power}}{\text{resistance}}$

This law presented three difficulties that Aristotle was aware of. The first is that if the imparted power is less than the resistance, then in reality it will not move the body, but Aristotle's relation says otherwise. Second, what is the source of the increase in imparted power required to increase the velocity of a freely falling body? Third, what is the imparted power that keeps a projectile in motion after it leaves the agent of projection? Aristotle, in his book Physics, Book 8, Chapter 10, 267a 4, proposed the following solution to the third problem in the case of a shot arrow. The bowstring or hand imparts a certain 'power of being a movent' to the air in contact with it, so that this imparted force is transmitted to the next layer of air, and so on, thus keeping the arrow in motion until the power gradually dissipates.

==== Chance ====
In his Physics Aristotle examines accidents (συμβεβηκός, symbebekòs) that have no cause but chance. "Nor is there any definite cause for an accident, but only chance (τύχη, týche), namely an indefinite (ἀόριστον, aóriston) cause" (Metaphysics V, 1025a25).

It is obvious that there are principles and causes which are generable and destructible apart from the actual processes of generation and destruction; for if this is not true, everything will be of necessity: that is, if there must necessarily be some cause, other than accidental, of that which is generated and destroyed. Will this be, or not? Yes, if this happens; otherwise not (Metaphysics VI, 1027a29).

=== Continuum and vacuum ===
Aristotle argues against the indivisibles of Democritus (which differ considerably from the historical and the modern use of the term "atom"). As a place without anything existing at or within it, Aristotle argued against the possibility of a vacuum or void. Because he believed that the speed of an object's motion is proportional to the force being applied (or, in the case of natural motion, the object's weight) and inversely proportional to the density of the medium, he reasoned that objects moving in a void would move indefinitely fast – and thus any and all objects surrounding the void would immediately fill it. The void, therefore, could never form.

The "voids" of modern-day astronomy (such as the Local Void adjacent to our own galaxy) have the opposite effect: ultimately, bodies off-center are ejected from the void due to the gravity of the material outside.

Aristotle's four causes illustrated using a table

=== Four causes ===
According to Aristotle, there are four ways to explain the aitia or causes of change. He writes that "we do not have knowledge of a thing until we have grasped its why, that is to say, its cause."

Aristotle held that there were four kinds of causes.

==== Material ====
The material cause of a thing is that of which it is made. For a table, that might be wood; for a statue, that might be bronze or marble.

"In one way we say that the aition is that out of which. as existing, something comes to be, like the bronze for the statue, the silver for the phial, and their genera" (194b2 3—6). By "genera", Aristotle means more general ways of classifying the matter (e.g. "metal"; "material"); and that will become important. A little later on, he broadens the range of the material cause to include letters (of syllables), fire and the other elements (of physical bodies), parts (of wholes), and even premises (of conclusions: Aristotle re-iterates this claim, in slightly different terms, in An. Post II. 11).

— R.J. Hankinson, "The Theory of the Physics" in Blackwell Companion to Aristotle

==== Formal ====
The formal cause of a thing is the essential property that makes it the kind of thing it is. In Metaphysics Book Α Aristotle emphasizes that form is closely related to essence and definition. He says for example that the ratio 2:1, and number in general, is the cause of the octave.

"Another [cause] is the form and the exemplar: this is the formula (logos) of the essence (to ti en einai), and its genera, for instance the ratio 2:1 of the octave" (Phys 11.3 194b26—8)... Form is not just shape... We are asking (and this is the connection with essence, particularly in its canonical Aristotelian formulation) what it is to be some thing. And it is a feature of musical harmonics (first noted and wondered at by the Pythagoreans) that intervals of this type do indeed exhibit this ratio in some form in the instruments used to create them (the length of pipes, of strings, etc.). In some sense, the ratio explains what all the intervals have in common, why they turn out the same.

— R.J. Hankinson, "Cause" in Blackwell Companion to Aristotle

==== Efficient ====
The efficient cause of a thing is the primary agency by which its matter took its form. For example, the efficient cause of a baby is a parent of the same species and that of a table is a carpenter, who knows the form of the table. In his Physics II, 194b29—32, Aristotle writes: "there is that which is the primary originator of the change and of its cessation, such as the deliberator who is responsible [sc. for the action] and the father of the child, and in general the producer of the thing produced and the changer of the thing changed."

Aristotle’s examples here are instructive: one case of mental and one of physical causation, followed by a perfectly general characterization. But they conceal (or at any rate fail to make patent) a crucial feature of Aristotle’s concept of efficient causation, and one which serves to distinguish it from most modern homonyms. For Aristotle, any process requires a constantly operative efficient cause as long as it continues. This commitment appears most starkly to modern eyes in Aristotle’s discussion of projectile motion: what keeps the projectile moving after it leaves the hand? "Impetus", "momentum", much less "inertia", are not possible answers. There must be a mover, distinct (at least in some sense) from the thing moved, which is exercising its motive capacity at every moment of the projectile’s flight (see Phys VIII. 10 266b29—267a11). Similarly, in every case of animal generation, there is always some thing responsible for the continuity of that generation, although it may do so by way of some intervening instrument (Phys II.3 194b35—195a3).

— R.J. Hankinson, "Causes" in Blackwell Companion to Aristotle

==== Final ====
The final cause is that for the sake of which something takes place, its aim or teleological purpose: for a germinating seed, it is the adult plant, for a ball at the top of a ramp, it is coming to rest at the bottom, for an eye, it is seeing, for a knife, it is cutting.

Goals have an explanatory function: that is a commonplace, at least in the context of action-ascriptions. Less of a commonplace is the view espoused by Aristotle, that finality and purpose are to be found throughout nature, which is for him the realm of those things which contain within themselves principles of movement and rest (i.e. efficient causes); thus it makes sense to attribute purposes not only to natural things themselves, but also to their parts: the parts of a natural whole exist for the sake of the whole. As Aristotle himself notes, "for the sake of" locutions are ambiguous: "A is for the sake of B" may mean that A exists or is undertaken in order to bring B about; or it may mean that A is for B’s benefit (An II.4 415b2—3, 20—1); but both types of finality have, he thinks, a crucial role to play in natural, as well as deliberative, contexts. Thus a man may exercise for the sake of his health: and so "health", and not just the hope of achieving it, is the cause of his action (this distinction is not trivial). But the eyelids are for the sake of the eye (to protect it: PA II.1 3) and the eye for the sake of the animal as a whole (to help it function properly: cf. An II.7).

— R.J. Hankinson, "Causes" in Blackwell Companion to Aristotle

=== Biology ===
According to Aristotle, the science of living things proceeds by gathering observations about each natural kind of animal, organizing them into genera and species (the differentiae in History of Animals) and then going on to study the causes (in Parts of Animals and Generation of Animals, his three main biological works).

The four causes of animal generation can be summarized as follows. The mother and father represent the material and efficient causes, respectively. The mother provides the matter out of which the embryo is formed, while the father provides the agency that informs that material and triggers its development. The formal cause is the definition of the animal’s substantial being (GA I.1 715a4: ho logos tês ousias). The final cause is the adult form, which is the end for the sake of which development takes place.

— Devin M. Henry, "Generation of Animals" in Blackwell Companion to Aristotle

==== Organism and mechanism ====
The four elements make up the uniform materials such as blood, flesh and bone, which are themselves the matter out of which are created the non-uniform organs of the body (e.g. the heart, liver and hands) "which in turn, as parts, are matter for the functioning body as a whole (PA II. 1 646a 13—24)."

[There] is a certain obvious conceptual economy about the view that in natural processes naturally constituted things simply seek to realize in full actuality the potentials contained within them (indeed, this is what is for them to be natural); on the other hand, as the detractors of Aristotelianism from the seventeenth century on were not slow to point out, this economy is won at the expense of any serious empirical content. Mechanism, at least as practiced by Aristotle’s contemporaries and predecessors, may have been explanatorily inadequate – but at least it was an attempt at a general account given in reductive terms of the lawlike connections between things. Simply introducing what later reductionists were to scoff at as "occult qualities" does not explain – it merely, in the manner of Molière’s famous satirical joke, serves to re-describe the effect. Formal talk, or so it is said, is vacuous.

Things are not however quite as bleak as this. For one thing, there’s no point in trying to engage in reductionist science if you don’t have the wherewithal, empirical and conceptual, to do so successfully: science shouldn't be simply unsubstantiated speculative metaphysics. But more than that, there is a point to describing the world in such teleologically loaded terms: it makes sense of things in a way that atomist speculations do not. And further, Aristotle’s talk of species-forms is not as empty as his opponents would insinuate. He doesn't simply say that things do what they do because that's the sort of thing they do: the whole point of his classificatory biology, most clearly exemplified in PA, is to show what sorts of function go with what, which presuppose which and which are subservient to which. And in this sense, formal or functional biology is susceptible of a type of reductionism. We start, he tells us, with the basic animal kinds which we all pre-theoretically (although not indefeasibly) recognize (cf. PA I.4): but we then go on to show how their parts relate to one another: why it is, for instance, that only blooded creatures have lungs, and how certain structures in one species are analogous or homologous to those in another (such as scales in fish, feathers in birds, hair in mammals). And the answers, for Aristotle, are to be found in the economy of functions, and how they all contribute to the overall well-being (the final cause in this sense) of the animal.

— R.J. Hankinson, "The Relations between the Causes" in Blackwell Companion to Aristotle

See also Organic form.

==== Psychology ====
According to Aristotle, perception and thought are similar, though not exactly alike in that perception is concerned only with the external objects that are acting on our sense organs at any given time, whereas we can think about anything we choose. Thought is about universal forms, in so far as they have been successfully understood, based on our memory of having encountered instances of those forms directly.

Aristotle’s theory of cognition rests on two central pillars: his account of perception and his account of thought. Together, they make up a significant portion of his psychological writings, and his discussion of other mental states depends critically on them. These two activities, moreover, are conceived of in an analogous manner, at least with regard to their most basic forms. Each activity is triggered by its object – each, that is, is about the very thing that brings it about. This simple causal account explains the reliability of cognition: perception and thought are, in effect, transducers, bringing information about the world into our cognitive systems, because, at least in their most basic forms, they are infallibly about the causes that bring them about (An III.4 429a13–18). Other, more complex mental states are far from infallible. But they are still tethered to the world, in so far as they rest on the unambiguous and direct contact perception and thought enjoy with their objects.

— Victor Caston, "Phantasia and Thought" in Blackwell Companion To Aristotle

== Medieval commentary ==
The Aristotelian theory of motion came under criticism and modification during the Middle Ages. Modifications began with John Philoponus in the 6th century, who partly accepted Aristotle's theory that "continuation of motion depends on continued action of a force" but modified it to include his idea that a hurled body also acquires an inclination (or "motive power") for movement away from whatever caused it to move, an inclination that secures its continued motion. This impressed virtue would be temporary and self-expending, meaning that all motion would tend toward the form of Aristotle's natural motion.

In The Book of Healing (1027), the 11th-century Persian polymath Avicenna developed Philoponean theory into the first coherent alternative to Aristotelian theory. Inclinations in the Avicennan theory of motion were not self-consuming but permanent forces whose effects were dissipated only as a result of external agents such as air resistance, making him "the first to conceive such a permanent type of impressed virtue for non-natural motion". Such a self-motion (mayl) is "almost the opposite of the Aristotelian conception of violent motion of the projectile type, and it is rather reminiscent of the principle of inertia, i.e. Newton's first law of motion."

The eldest Banū Mūsā brother, Ja'far Muhammad ibn Mūsā ibn Shākir (800-873), wrote the Astral Motion and The Force of Attraction. The Persian physicist, Ibn al-Haytham (965-1039) discussed the theory of attraction between bodies. It seems that he was aware of the magnitude of acceleration due to gravity and he discovered that the heavenly bodies "were accountable to the laws of physics". During his debate with Avicenna, al-Biruni also criticized the Aristotelian theory of gravity firstly for denying the existence of levity or gravity in the celestial spheres; and, secondly, for its notion of circular motion being an innate property of the heavenly bodies.

Hibat Allah Abu'l-Barakat al-Baghdaadi (1080–1165) wrote al-Mu'tabar, a critique of Aristotelian physics where he negated Aristotle's idea that a constant force produces uniform motion, as he realized that a force applied continuously produces acceleration, a fundamental law of classical mechanics and an early foreshadowing of Newton's second law of motion. Like Newton, he described acceleration as the rate of change of speed.

In the 14th century, Jean Buridan developed the theory of impetus as an alternative to the Aristotelian theory of motion. The theory of impetus was a precursor to the concepts of inertia and momentum in classical mechanics. Buridan and Albert of Saxony also refer to Abu'l-Barakat in explaining that the acceleration of a falling body is a result of its increasing impetus. In the 16th century, Al-Birjandi discussed the possibility of the Earth's rotation and, in his analysis of what might occur if the Earth were rotating, developed a hypothesis similar to Galileo's notion of "circular inertia". He described it in terms of the following observational test:

"The small or large rock will fall to the Earth along the path of a line that is perpendicular to the plane (sath) of the horizon; this is witnessed by experience (tajriba). And this perpendicular is away from the tangent point of the Earth’s sphere and the plane of the perceived (hissi) horizon. This point moves with the motion of the Earth and thus there will be no difference in place of fall of the two rocks."

== Life and death of Aristotelian physics ==
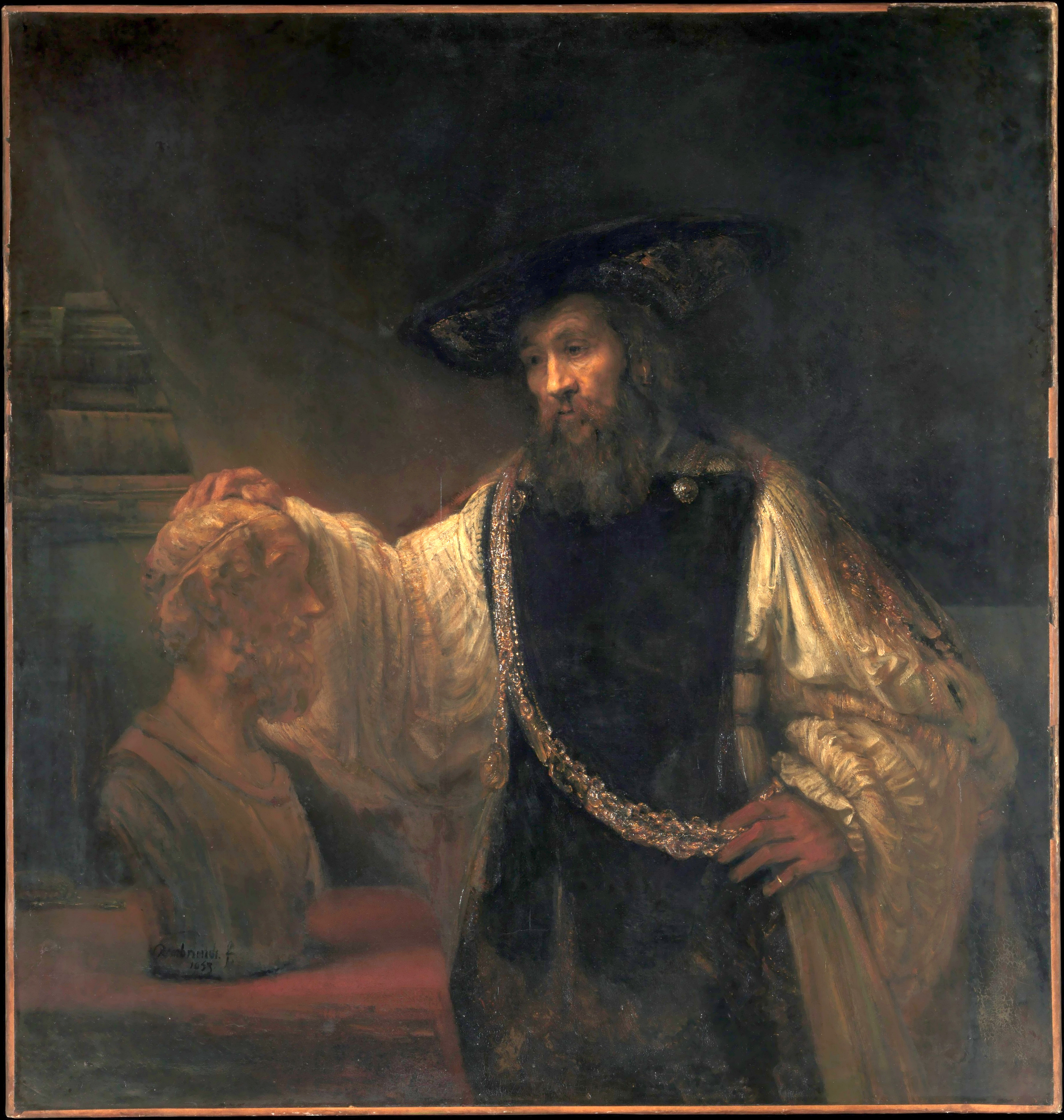
Aristotle depicted by Rembrandt, 1653

The reign of Aristotelian physics, the earliest known speculative theory of physics, lasted almost two millennia. After the work of many pioneers such as Copernicus, Tycho Brahe, Galileo, Kepler, Descartes and Newton, it became generally accepted that Aristotelian physics was neither correct nor viable. Despite this, it survived as a scholastic pursuit well into the seventeenth century, until universities amended their curricula.

In Europe, Aristotle's theory was first convincingly discredited by Galileo's studies. Using a telescope, Galileo observed that the Moon was not entirely smooth, but had craters and mountains, contradicting the Aristotelian idea of the incorruptibly perfect smooth Moon. Galileo also criticized this notion theoretically; a perfectly smooth Moon would reflect light unevenly like a shiny billiard ball, so that the edges of the moon's disk would have a different brightness than the point where a tangent plane reflects sunlight directly to the eye. A rough moon reflects in all directions equally, leading to a disk of approximately equal brightness which is what is observed. Galileo also observed that Jupiter has moons – i.e. objects revolving around a body other than the Earth – and noted the phases of Venus, which demonstrated that Venus (and, by implication, Mercury) traveled around the Sun, not the Earth.

According to legend, Galileo dropped balls of various densities from the Tower of Pisa and found that lighter and heavier ones fell at almost the same speed. His experiments actually took place using balls rolling down inclined planes, a form of falling sufficiently slow to be measured without advanced instruments.

In a relatively dense medium such as water, a heavier body falls faster than a lighter one. This led Aristotle to speculate that the rate of falling is proportional to the weight and inversely proportional to the density of the medium. From his experience with objects falling in water, he concluded that water is approximately ten times denser than air. By weighing a volume of compressed air, Galileo showed that this overestimates the density of air by a factor of forty. From his experiments with inclined planes, he concluded that if friction is neglected, all bodies fall at the same rate (which is also not true, since not only friction but also density of the medium relative to density of the bodies has to be negligible. Aristotle correctly noticed that medium density is a factor but focused on body weight instead of density. Galileo neglected medium density which led him to correct conclusion for vacuum).

Galileo also advanced a theoretical argument to support his conclusion. He asked if two bodies of different weights and different rates of fall are tied by a string, does the combined system fall faster because it is now more massive, or does the lighter body in its slower fall hold back the heavier body? The only convincing answer is neither: all the systems fall at the same rate.

Followers of Aristotle were aware that the motion of falling bodies was not uniform, but picked up speed with time. Since time is an abstract quantity, the peripatetics postulated that the speed was proportional to the distance. Galileo established experimentally that the speed is proportional to the time, but he also gave a theoretical argument that the speed could not possibly be proportional to the distance. In modern terms, if the rate of fall is proportional to the distance, the differential expression for the distance y travelled after time t is:

$${dy\over dt} \propto y$$

with the condition that $y(0)=0$. Galileo demonstrated that this system would stay at $y=0$ for all time. If a perturbation set the system into motion somehow, the object would pick up speed exponentially in time, not linearly.

Standing on the surface of the Moon in 1971, David Scott famously repeated Galileo's experiment by dropping a feather and a hammer from each hand at the same time. In the absence of a substantial atmosphere, the two objects fell and hit the Moon's surface at the same time.

The first convincing mathematical theory of gravity – in which two masses are attracted toward each other by a force whose effect decreases according to the inverse square of the distance between them – was Newton's law of universal gravitation. This, in turn, was replaced by the General theory of relativity due to Albert Einstein.

== Modern evaluations of Aristotle's physics ==
Modern scholars differ in their opinions of whether Aristotle's physics were sufficiently based on empirical observations to qualify as science, or else whether they were derived primarily from philosophical speculation and thus fail to satisfy the scientific method.

Carlo Rovelli has argued that Aristotle's physics are an accurate and non-intuitive representation of a particular domain (motion in fluids), and thus are just as scientific as Newton's laws of motion, which also are accurate in some domains while failing in others (i.e. special and general relativity).

== As listed in the Corpus Aristotelicum ==
Key

*	Authenticity disputed.
[ ]	Generally agreed to be spurious.

Bekker
number
Work
Latin name
Physics (natural philosophy)
184a
Physics
Physica
268a
On the Heavens
De Caelo
314a
On Generation and Corruption
De Generatione et Corruptione
338a
Meteorology
Meteorologica
391a
[On the Universe]
[De Mundo]
402a
On the Soul
De Anima

Parva Naturalia ("Short Works on Nature")
436a
Sense and Sensibilia
De Sensu et Sensibilibus
449b
On Memory
De Memoria et Reminiscentia
453b
On Sleep
De Somno et Vigilia
458a
On Dreams
De Insomniis
462b
On Divination in Sleep
De Divinatione per Somnum
464b
On Length and Shortness
of Life
De Longitudine et Brevitate Vitae
467b
On Youth, Old Age, Life
and Death, and Respiration
De Juventute et Senectute, De
Vita et Morte, De Respiratione

481a
[On Breath]
[De Spiritu]

486a
History of Animals
Historia Animalium
639a
Parts of Animals
De Partibus Animalium
698a
Movement of Animals
De Motu Animalium
704a
Progression of Animals
De Incessu Animalium
715a
Generation of Animals
De Generatione Animalium

791a
[On Colors]
[De Coloribus]
800a
[On Things Heard]
[De audibilibus]
805a
[Physiognomonics]
[Physiognomonica]
815a
[On Plants]
[De Plantis]
830a
[On Marvellous Things Heard]
[De mirabilibus auscultationibus]
847a
[Mechanics]
[Mechanica]
859a
Problems*
Problemata*
968a
[On Indivisible Lines]
[De Lineis Insecabilibus]
973a
[The Situations and Names
of Winds]
[Ventorum Situs]
974a
[On Melissus, Xenophanes,
and Gorgias]
[De Melisso, Xenophane, Gorgia]

== See also ==
- Minima naturalia, a hylomorphic concept suggested by Aristotle broadly analogous in Peripatetic and Scholastic physical speculation to the atoms of Epicureanism

== Notes ==
a Here, the term "Earth" does not refer to planet Earth, known by modern science to be composed of a large number of chemical elements. Modern chemical elements are not conceptually similar to Aristotle's elements; the term "air", for instance, does not refer to breathable air.

== Sources ==
- H. Carteron (1965) "Does Aristotle Have a Mechanics?" in Articles on Aristotle 1. Science eds. Jonathan Barnes, Malcolm Schofield, Richard Sorabji (London: General Duckworth and Company Limited), 161–174.
- Ragep, F. Jamil (2001). "Tusi and Copernicus: The Earth's Motion in Context". Science in Context. 14 (1–2). Cambridge University Press: 145–163. doi:10.1017/s0269889701000060. S2CID 145372613.
- Ragep, F. Jamil; Al-Qushji, Ali (2001). "Freeing Astronomy from Philosophy: An Aspect of Islamic Influence on Science". Osiris. 2nd Series. 16 (Science in Theistic Contexts: Cognitive Dimensions): 49–64 and 66–71. Bibcode:2001Osir...16...49R. doi:10.1086/649338. S2CID 142586786.
