= Conimbricenses =

Jesuit commentaries on Aristotle

The Conimbricenses are an important collection of Jesuit commentaries on Aristotle compiled at University of Coimbra in Coimbra, Portugal.

== Commentaries ==
The Coimbra Commentaries, also known as the Conimbricenses or Cursus Conimbricenses, are a group of 11 books on Aristotle (only eight can be called commentaries). They were produced as part of King John III of Portugal's efforts to make the University of Coimbra rival the University of Paris. The names of 200 Jesuits, including those of professors and students, appeared repeatedly on the college registries. From the late 16th to the early 17th centuries, the university produced voluminous commentaries on Aristotle's philosophical writings. The commentaries were, in fact, dictated to the students by the professors and so were not intended for publication. After they were published anyway, to interpret and disown incorrect and unauthorized editions, Claudio Acquaviva, the General of the Society of Jesus, assigned Pedro da Fonseca, the provincial of the Portuguese province, the task of supervising the revision of the commentaries for authorized publication. Fonseca was called "the Aristotle of Portugal" by Charles George Herbermann in his Catholic Encyclopedia.

=== Contents ===
The treatises appeared in the following order:

1. Commentarii Collegii Conimbricenses Societatis Jesu in octo libros Physicorum Aristotelis Stagyritæ, (Coimbra, 1591, reprint Hildesheim, Georg Olms, 1984);
2. Commentarii Collegii Conimbricenses Societatis Jesu in quattuor libros Physicorum Aristotelis de Cœlo (Coimbra, 1592);
3. Commentarii Collegii Conimbricensis Societatis Jesu in libros Meteororum Aristotelis Stagyritæ (Coimbra, 1592);
4. Commentarii Collegii Conimbricensis Societatis Jesu in libros Aristotelis qui Parva naturalia appelantur (Coimbra, 1592);
5. Commentarii Collegii Conimbricensis Societatis Jesu in libros Ethicorum Aristotelis ad Nichomachum aliquot Cursus Conimbricensis disputationes in quibus præcipua quaedam Ethicæ disciplinæ capita continentur (Coimbra, 1595);
6. Commentarii Collegii Conimbricensis Societatis Jesu in duos libros Aristotelis De generatione et corruptione (Coimbra, 1595, reprint Hildesheim, Georg Olms, 2003);
7. Commentarii Collegii Conimbricensis Societatis Jesu in tres libros Aristotelis De Anima (Coimbra, 1592 reprint Hildesheim, Georg Olms, 2006). This treatise was published after the death of Father Manuel de Góis (whom Father Fonseca had commissioned to publish the earlier volumes) by Father Comas Maggalliano (Magalhães). He added a treatise of Father Balthazaar Alvarez De Anima Separata and his own work Tractatio aliquot problematum ad quinque Sensus Spectantium;
8. Commentarii Collegii Conimbricensis Societatis Jesu In universam dialecticam nunc primum (ed. Venice, 1606, reprint Hildesheim, Georg Olms, 1976) The works commented are In Isagogem Porphyry, In libros Categoriarium Aristotelis, In libros Aristotelis de Interpretatione, In libros Aristotelis Stagiritae de Priori Resolutione, In primum librum Posteriorum Aristotelis, In librum primum Topicorum Aristotelis and In duos libros Elenchorum Aristotelis.

A foreword prefixed the last treatise and disowned any connection with the work published at Frankfurt in 1604 and claiming to be the "Commentarii Conimbricenses". It reads in part, "Before we could finish the task entrusted to us of editing our Logic, to which we were bound by many promises, certain German publishers fraudulently brought out a work professing to be from us, abounding in errors and inaccuracies which were really their own. They also substituted for our commentaries certain glosses gotten furtively. It is true these writings thirty years previously were the work of one of our professors not indeed intended for publication. They were the fruit of his zeal and he never dreamed they would appear in print".

The last treatise was prepared for printing by Father Sebastian Couto. The eight parts formed five quarto volumes in wide circulation and appeared in many editions. The best known were those of Lyon, Lisbon and Cologne. The Commentaries are in Latin and are supplemented by reliable explanations of the text and an exhaustive discussion of the Aristotelian system.

In the Introduction to his translation work, John Doyle writes that three methods were utilized in the Conimbricenses. The first, summary, reflects the work of Avicenna. The second method, explanation, reflects the work of Averroes. The third method, exposition by way of question, reflects the work of Duns Scotus. The Conimbricenses relied heavily on exposition by way of question while still employing summary and explanation.

== Influence ==
According to American philosopher John Deely, Poinsot and Peirce owe their attention to "Thirdness" to the influence of the Conimbricenses.

In the Introduction to the English translation of The Conimbricenses. Some Questions on Signs, Doyle writes that

These commentaries had broad influence throughout the seventeenth century in Europe, North and South America, Africa, India, and the Far East, including both Japan and China.

Doyle goes on to write that Descartes, Leibniz, and possibly Spinoza were influenced by the Conimbricenses.

== Translation ==
- The Conimbricenses. Some Questions on Signs, Milwaukee: Marquette University Press 2001. (Translation with an introduction and notes by John P. Doyle of the commentary to the first chapter of Aristotle's De Interpretatione; "Foreword" 'A New Determination of the Middle Ages' by John Deely.)

== See also ==
- Pedro da Fonseca (philosopher)
- School of Salamanca
