= Dynamics of the celestial spheres =

Classical theories concerning movement of spheres

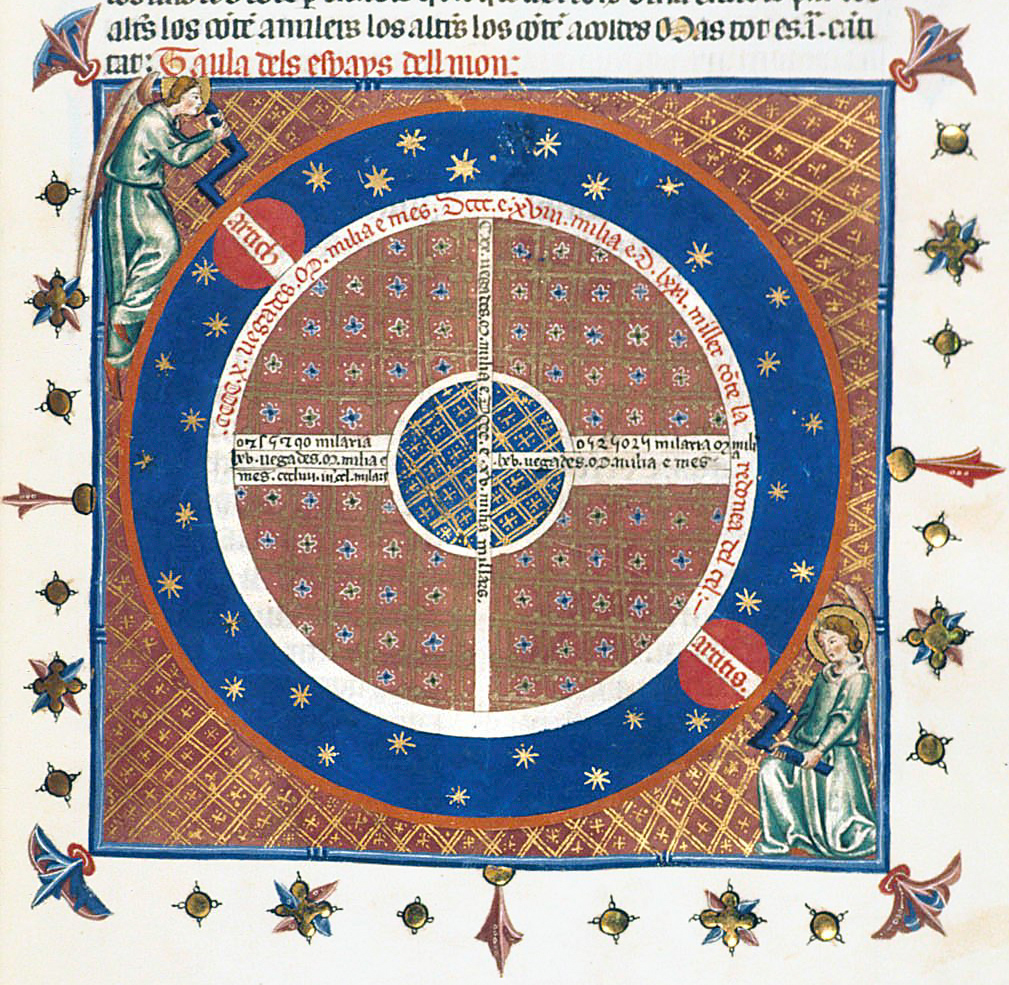
Fourteenth-century drawing of angels turning the celestial spheres

Ancient, medieval and Renaissance astronomers and philosophers developed many different theories about the dynamics of the celestial spheres. They explained the motions of the various nested spheres in terms of the materials of which they were made, external movers such as celestial intelligences, and internal movers such as motive souls or impressed forces. Most of these models were qualitative, although a few of them incorporated quantitative analyses that related speed, motive force and resistance.

== The celestial material and its natural motions ==
In considering the physics of the celestial spheres, scholars followed two different views about the material composition of the celestial spheres. For Plato, the celestial regions were made "mostly out of fire" on account of fire's mobility. Later Platonists, such as Plotinus, maintained that although fire moves naturally upward in a straight line toward its natural place at the periphery of the universe, when it arrived there, it would either rest or move naturally in a circle. This account was compatible with Aristotle's meteorology of a fiery region in the upper air, dragged along underneath the circular motion of the lunar sphere. For Aristotle, however, the spheres themselves were made entirely of a special fifth element, Aether (Αἰθήρ), the bright, untainted upper atmosphere in which the gods dwell, as distinct from the dense lower atmosphere, Aer (Ἀήρ). While the four terrestrial elements (earth, water, air and fire) gave rise to the generation and corruption of natural substances by their mutual transformations, aether was unchanging, moving always with a uniform circular motion that was uniquely suited to the celestial spheres, which were eternal. Earth and water had a natural heaviness (gravitas), which they expressed by moving downward toward the center of the universe. Fire and air had a natural lightness (levitas), such that they moved upward, away from the center. Aether, being neither heavy nor light, moved naturally around the center.

== The causes of celestial motion ==
As early as Plato, philosophers considered the heavens to be moved by immaterial agents. Plato believed the cause to be a world-soul, created according to mathematical principles, which governed the daily motion of the heavens (the motion of the Same) and the opposed motions of the planets along the zodiac (the motion of the Different). Aristotle proposed the existence of divine unmoved movers which act as final causes; the celestial spheres mimic the movers, as best they could, by moving with uniform circular motion. In his Metaphysics, Aristotle maintained that an individual unmoved mover would be required to insure each individual motion in the heavens. While stipulating that the number of spheres, and thus gods, is subject to revision by astronomers, he estimated the total as 47 or 55, depending on whether one followed the model of Eudoxus or Callippus. In On the Heavens, Aristotle presented an alternate view of eternal circular motion as moving itself, in the manner of Plato's world-soul, which lent support to three principles of celestial motion: an internal soul, an external unmoved mover, and the celestial material (aether).

=== Later Greek interpreters ===
In his Planetary Hypotheses, Ptolemy (c. 90 – c. 168) rejected the Aristotelian concept of an external prime mover, maintaining instead that the planets have souls and move themselves with a voluntary motion. Each planet sends out motive emissions that direct its own motion and the motions of the epicycle and deferent that make up its system, just as a bird sends out emissions to its nerves that direct the motions of its feet and wings.

John Philoponus (490–570) considered that the heavens were made of fire, not of aether, yet maintained that circular motion is one of the two natural motions of fire. In a theological work, On the Creation of the World (De opificio mundi), he denied that the heavens are moved by either a soul or by angels, proposing that "it is not impossible that God, who created all these things, imparted a motive force to the Moon, the Sun, and other stars – just as the inclination to heavy and light bodies, and the movements due to the internal soul to all living beings – in order that the angels do not move them by force." This is interpreted as an application of the concept of impetus to the motion of the celestial spheres. In an earlier commentary on Aristotle's Physics, Philoponus compared the innate power or nature that accounts for the rotation of the heavens to the innate power or nature that accounts for the fall of rocks.

=== Islamic interpreters ===
The Islamic philosophers al-Farabi (c. 872 – c. 950) and Avicenna (c. 980–1037), following Plotinus, maintained that Aristotle's movers, called intelligences, came into being through a series of emanations beginning with God. A first intelligence emanated from God, and from the first intelligence emanated a sphere, its soul, and a second intelligence. The process continued down through the celestial spheres until the sphere of the Moon, its soul, and a final intelligence. They considered that each sphere was moved continually by its soul, seeking to emulate the perfection of its intelligence. Avicenna maintained that besides an intelligence and its soul, each sphere was also moved by a natural inclination (mayl).

An interpreter of Aristotle from Muslim Spain, al-Bitruji (d. c. 1024), proposed a radical transformation of astronomy that did away with epicycles and eccentrics, in which the celestial spheres were driven by a single unmoved mover at the periphery of the universe. The spheres thus moved with a "natural nonviolent motion". The mover's power diminished with increasing distance from the periphery so that the lower spheres lagged behind in their daily motion around the Earth; this power reached even as far as the sphere of water, producing the tides.

More influential for later Christian thinkers were the teachings of Averroes (1126–1198), who agreed with Avicenna that the intelligences and souls combine to move the spheres but rejected his concept of emanation. Considering how the soul acts, he maintained that the soul moves its sphere without effort, for the celestial material has no tendency to a contrary motion.

Later in the century, the mutakallim Adud al-Din al-Iji (1281–1355) rejected the principle of uniform and circular motion, following the Ash'ari doctrine of atomism, which maintained that all physical effects were caused directly by God's will rather than by natural causes. He maintained that the celestial spheres were "imaginary things" and "more tenuous than a spider's web". His views were challenged by al-Jurjani (1339–1413), who argued that even if the celestial spheres "do not have an external reality, yet they are things that are correctly imagined and correspond to what [exists] in actuality."

=== Medieval Western Europe ===
In the Early Middle Ages, Plato's picture of the heavens was dominant among European philosophers, which led Christian thinkers to question the role and nature of the world-soul. With the recovery of Aristotle's works in the twelfth and thirteenth centuries, Aristotle's views supplanted the earlier Platonism, and a new set of questions regarding the relationships of the unmoved movers to the spheres and to God emerged.

In the early phases of the Western recovery of Aristotle, Robert Grosseteste (c. 1175–1253), influenced by medieval Platonism and by the astronomy of al-Bitruji, rejected the idea that the heavens are moved by either souls or intelligences. Adam Marsh's (c. 1200–1259) treatise On the Ebb and Flow of the Sea, which was formerly attributed to Grosseteste, maintained al-Bitruji's opinion that the celestial spheres and the seas are moved by a peripheral mover whose motion weakens with distance.

Thomas Aquinas (c. 1225–1274), following Avicenna, interpreted Aristotle to mean that there were two immaterial substances responsible for the motion of each celestial sphere, a soul that was an integral part of its sphere, and an intelligence that was separate from its sphere. The soul shares the motion of its sphere and causes the sphere to move through its love and desire for the unmoved separate intelligence. Avicenna, al-Ghazali, Moses Maimonides, and most Christian scholastic philosophers identified Aristotle's intelligences with the angels of revelation, thereby associating an angel with each of the spheres. Moreover, Aquinas rejected the idea that celestial bodies are moved by an internal nature, similar to the heaviness and lightness that moves terrestrial bodies. Attributing souls to the spheres was theologically controversial, as that could make them animals. After the Condemnations of 1277, most philosophers came to reject the idea that the celestial spheres had souls.

Robert Kilwardby (c. 1215–1279) discussed three alternative explanations of the motions of the celestial spheres, rejecting the views that celestial bodies are animated and are moved by their own spirits or souls, or that the celestial bodies are moved by angelic spirits, which govern and move them. He maintained, instead, that "celestial bodies are moved by their own natural inclinations similar to weight." Just as heavy bodies are naturally moved by their own weight, which is an intrinsic active principle, so the celestial bodies are naturally moved by a similar intrinsic principle. Since the heavens are spherical, the only motion that could be natural to them is rotation. Kilwardby's idea had been earlier held by another Oxford scholar, John Blund (c. 1175–1248).

In two slightly different discussions, John Buridan (c. 1295 – c. 1358) suggested that when God created the celestial spheres, he began to move them, impressing in them a circular impetus that would be neither corrupted nor diminished, since there was neither an inclination to other movements nor any resistance in the celestial region. He noted that this would allow God to rest on the seventh day, but he left the matter to be resolved by the theologians.

Nicole Oresme (c. 1323-1382) explained the motion of the spheres in traditional terms of the action of intelligences but noted that, contrary to Aristotle, some intelligences are moved; for example, the intelligence that moves the Moon's epicycle shares the motion of the lunar orb in which the epicycle is embedded. He related the spheres' motions to the proportion of motive power to resistance that was impressed in each sphere when God created the heavens. In discussing the relation of the moving power of the intelligence, the resistance of the sphere, and the circular velocity, he said "this ratio ought not to be called a ratio of force to resistance except by analogy, because an intelligence moves by will alone ... and the heavens do not resist it."

According to Grant, except for Oresme, scholastic thinkers did not consider the force-resistance model to be properly applicable to the motion of celestial bodies, although some, such as Bartholomeus Amicus, thought analogically in terms of force and resistance. By the end of the Middle Ages it was the common opinion among philosophers that the celestial bodies were moved by external intelligences, or angels, and not by some kind of an internal mover.

=== The movers and Copernicanism ===
Although Nicolaus Copernicus (1473–1543) transformed Ptolemaic astronomy and Aristotelian cosmology by moving the Earth from the center of the universe, he retained both the traditional model of the celestial spheres and the medieval Aristotelian views of the causes of its motion. Copernicus follows Aristotle to maintain that circular motion is natural to the form of a sphere. However, he also appears to have accepted the traditional philosophical belief that the spheres are moved by an external mover.

Johannes Kepler's (1571–1630) cosmology eliminated the celestial spheres, but he held that the planets were moved both by an external motive power, which he located in the Sun, and a motive soul associated with each planet. In an early manuscript discussing the motion of Mars, Kepler considered the Sun to cause the circular motion of the planet. He then attributed the inward and outward motion of the planet, which transforms its overall motion from circular to oval, to a moving soul in the planet since the motion is "not a natural motion, but more of an animate one". In various writings, Kepler often attributed a kind of intelligence to the inborn motive faculties associated with the stars.

In the aftermath of Copernicanism the planets came to be seen as bodies moving freely through a very subtle aethereal medium. Although many scholastics continued to maintain that intelligences were the celestial movers, they now associated the intelligences with the planets themselves, rather than with the celestial spheres.

== See also ==
- Christian angelic hierarchy
