= Manuel de Góis =

Portuguese philosopher

Manuel de Góis (1543–1597) was a Portuguese Jesuit philosopher and the director of the Commentarii Collegii Conimbricensis Societatis Iesu (Coimbra Jesuit College Commentaries), a series of eight volumes of commentaries on Aristotle published at Coimbra and Lisbon between 1592 and 1606.

Góis was born in Portel in 1543 to João Vagueiro and Maria Álvares. There are conflicting accounts of his education. He joined the Jesuits on 31 August 1560. By 1568, he was teaching the humanities at the University of Coimbra, where he met Luis de Molina. From 1574 to 1582, he taught philosophy. He died at Coimbra on 13 February 1597.

Góis's major philosophical works are the seven commentaries he contributed to the Commentarii Collegii Conimbricensis Societatis Iesu on Aristotle's Physics, Meteorology, Parva Naturalia, Ethics, On the Heavens, On the Soul and On Generation and Corruption. He also wrote an unpublished work, Utrum intellectus sit potentia nobilior voluntate, at Coimbra in 1582.
