= Pedro da Fonseca (philosopher) =

Portuguese Jesuit philosopher and theologian

The Reverend Pedro da Fonseca SJ
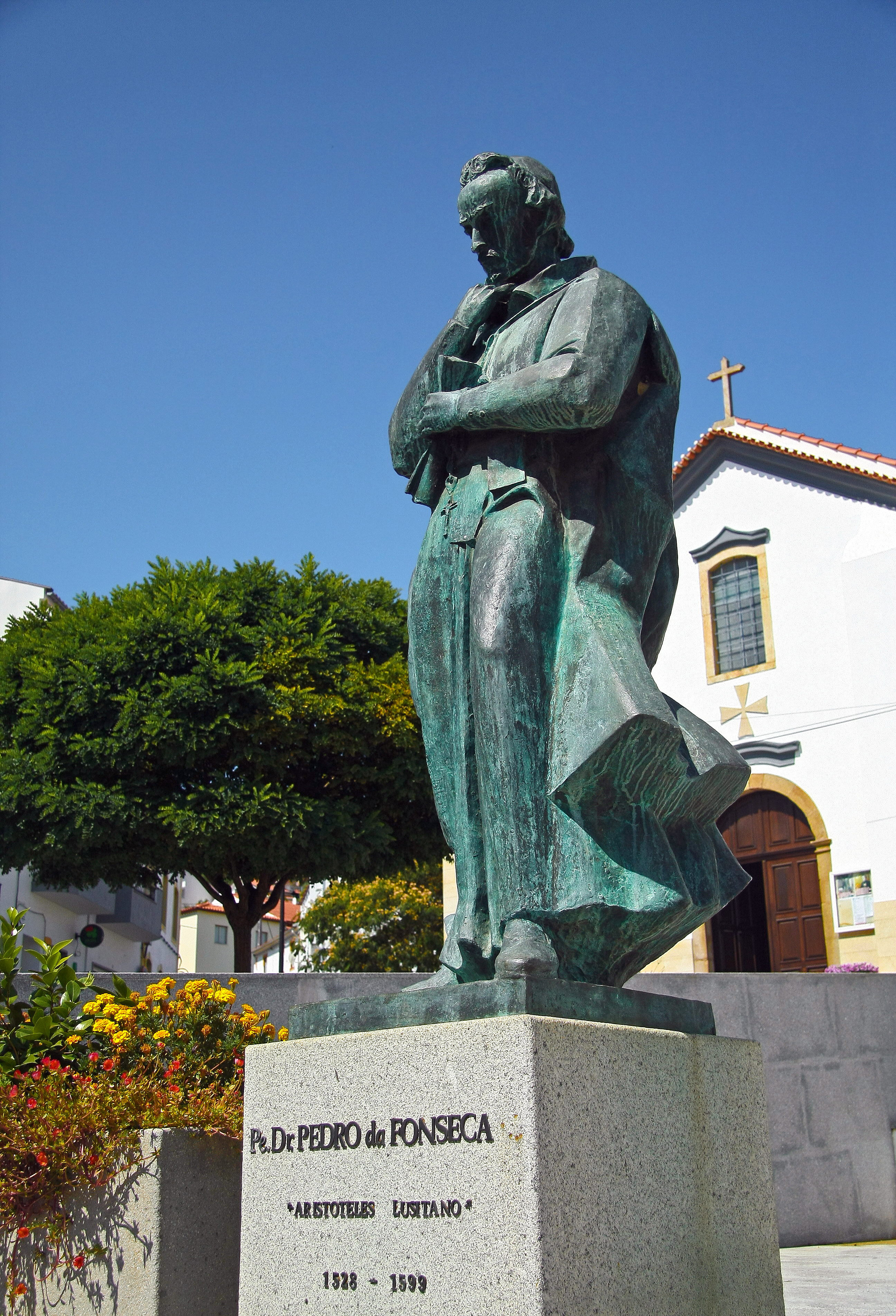
- Monument to Doctor Pedro da Fonseca, Proença-a-Nova, Portugal
- Born: 1528; Proença-a-Nova, Kingdom of Portugal
- Died: 4 November 1599 (aged 70–71); Lisbon, Kingdom of Portugal

Education
- Education: University of Évora

Philosophical work
- Era: 16th-century philosophy
- Region: Western philosophy; Spanish philosophy
- School: Second scholasticism, School of Salamanca
- Institutions: University of Évora
- Notable students: Luis de Molina
- Main interests: Logic; metaphysics
- Notable ideas: Revival of Aristotelian metaphysics

Pedro da Fonseca (Latin: Petrus Fonsecae; 1528 – 4 November 1599) was a Portuguese Jesuit Catholic priest, philosopher, theologian, and member of the School of Salamanca. His work on logic and metaphysics made him known in his time as the Portuguese Aristotle; he projected the 'Cursus Conimbricensis' realized by Manuel de Góis and others.

== Biography ==
Pedro da Fonseca was born in Proença-a-Nova, Portugal, in 1528 and joined the Society of Jesus in Coimbra in 1548. From 1551 to 1555 he studied and taught at the newly established University of Évora. In 1555 he returned to Coimbra, where he taught philosophy at the Colégio das Artes until 1561. From 1564 to 1571 he again worked in Évora, initially as professor of theology and later as chancellor of the university. He lived in Rome as a scholar and ecclesiastical administrator from 1572 to 1582. Fonseca's most important scholarly work was a commentary on Aristotle's Metaphysics (4 vols., 1577–89). In logic, where his thinking was more closely aligned with humanism than with scholasticism, his main publications were Institutionum Dialecticarum (1564), and Isagoge Philosophica (1591).

Fonseca filled many important posts in his order, being assistant, for Portugal, to the general, visitor of Portugal, and superior of the professed house at Lisbon; while Gregory XIII and Philip II (from 1580 King of Portugal) employed him in affairs of the greatest delicacy and consequence. Fonseca used his influence wisely in promoting the interests of charity and learning. Many great institutions in Lisbon, notably the Irish college, owe their existence, at least in great part, to his zeal and piety. He is also credited with a considerable share in the drawing up of the Jesuit Ratio Studiorum. But his greatest claim to lasting reputation lies in the fact that he first devised the solution, by his scientia media in God, of the perplexing problem of the reconciliation of grace and free will. Nevertheless his fame in this matter has been somewhat obscured by that of his disciple, Luis de Molina, who, having more fully developed and perfected the ideas of his master in his work Concordia Liberi Arbitrii cum Gratiæ Donis, came gradually to be regarded as the originator of the doctrine.

== Works ==
- Institutionum Dialecticarum. Lisbon: 1564.
- Commentariorum in Libros Metaphysicorum Aristotelis. Rome: 1577.
- Isagoge Philosophica. Lisbon: 1591.

== See also ==
- Conimbricenses

== Sources ==
- Carlos Sommervogel, Bibliothèque de la Compagnie de Jésus, III, 837;
- Augustin de Backer, Bibliothèque des écrivains de la Compagnie de Jésus, I, 313, VII, 239.
