= Aedesia =

5th-century Greek a philosopher

Aedesia (Ancient Greek: Αἰδεσία) was a philosopher of the Neoplatonic school who lived in Alexandria in the fifth century AD. She was a relation of Syrianus and the wife of Hermias, and was equally celebrated for her beauty and her virtues. After the death of her husband, she devoted herself to relieving the wants of the distressed and the education of her children, Ammonius and Heliodorus. She accompanied the latter to Athens, where they went to study philosophy, and was received with great distinction by all the philosophers there, and especially by Proclus, to whom she had been betrothed by Syrianus, when she was quite young. She lived to a considerable age, and her funeral oration was pronounced by Damascius, who was then a young man, in hexameter verses.
