= Stemma codicum of Aristotle's Metaphysics =

The stemma codicum of Aristotle's Metaphysics is a visual representation with the shape of a family tree, which is the standard one in stemmatics. It is meant to show the relationships of the surviving manuscripts of the Greek text, with special reference to those which are to be taken into account for a critical edition, hence for translations in modern languages, for commentaries, and for any other kind of scholarly reference to the text of the Metaphysics. It is partly conjectural by its own nature and it is an object of lively debate, since these latest years especially.

== Overview ==
The main controversial question the stemma is meant to answer is the role of the so called beta group of manuscripts of the Metaphysics, described as a separate beta branch in the stemma. Special focus is on manuscript Ab (Laur. 87.12), as opposed to the alpha group of manuscripts (which forms the main part of the tree) and especially to its oldest representative, namely J (Wien Phil. Gr. 100) and E (Paris. Gr. 1853). The first partial draft of a stemma, including Ab, E, J, has been produced by Alfred Gercke in 1892. On this basis, 20th century editors, William David Ross (1924) and Werner Jaeger (1957), have taken into account eclectically Ab in the one side and J and E on the other.

Different versions of the stemma codicum of the Metaphysics have been proposed since 1970, most remarkably by Dieter Harlfinger in 1979.

According to Harlfinger’s stemma, current 20th century editions of the Metaphysics (Ross, Jaeger) rely on the most valuable manuscripts for most of the fourteen books, except for the last ones: starting from the final part of the 12th book, they should not have used Ab, but other beta manuscripts instead (M, C), which form no longer a unified group with Ab.

In 2010, Silvia Fazzo suggested a revision of Harlfinger’s stemma according to which manuscript Ab should not be followed in the whole of book 12 either, nor in the final part of book 11. She showed that starting from book 11 chapter 8 already Harlfinger’s supposed beta manuscripts Ab, M, C do not form any unified group.

In 2015, Pantelis Golitsis replied to Fazzo’s revision showing that starting from book 11 chapter 8 manuscripts M and C can not be regarded as representative of a separate beta branch. Based on unpublished new collations funded by the DFG, Golitsis shows that M and C are heavily collated (others would say ‘contaminated’ in this case) with various sources including late manuscripts of the alpha group (when this kind of collation is concerned, Golitsis argues that the idea of contamination should be left aside and rejected). He then submitted a revised version of Harlfinger’s stemma codicum.

In 2015, Fazzo further argued that neither Ab nor its cognate manuscripts M and C should be followed at all as long as the reading of J and E is not proved to be corrupt. Based on published and available materials she submitted a different stemma where all manuscripts ultimately stem from a unique source, possibly archetype Π from which manuscripts J and E are directly derived. As a consequence, a critical editor is left with manuscripts J and E as the most reliable basis. In 2017 Fazzo submitted her stemma to discussion in the Revue d’Histoire des Textes, prefaced with a general history of the stemma codicum of the Metaphysics. There she agrees with Golitsis vs. Harlfinger that manuscripts M and C should not be regarded as representative of an independent beta source for the final books of the Metaphysics. Moreover, Fazzo argues that the bifid shape of 20th century proposals concerning the stemma codicum heavily depends on the implicit acceptance of Jaeger's genetic views as applied to the manuscripts tradition of the Metaphysics.

== Bibliography ==
- W. D. Ross (ed.), Aristotle's Metaphysics, Oxford: Clarendon Press, 1924. (two volumes). Reprinted 1953 with corrections.
- Werner Jaeger (ed.), Aristotelis Metaphysica, Oxford Classical Texts. Oxford University Press, 1957.
