= Asclepius of Tralles =

6th-century Greek philosopher and mathematician

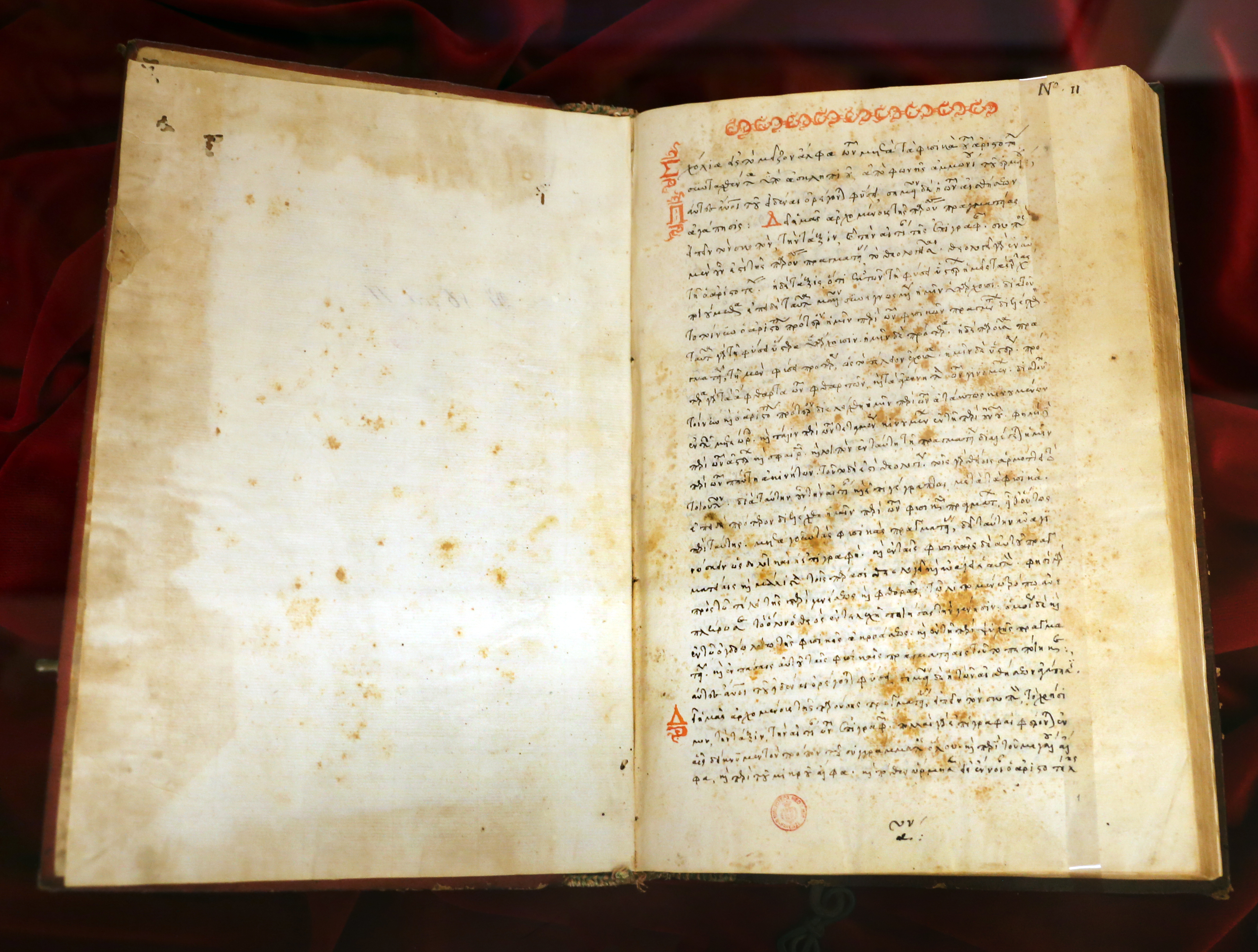
Comentarius of Alpha Meizon from Aristotle's Metaphysics

Asclepius of Tralles (Greek: Ἀσκληπιός; died c. 560–570) was a Neoplatonic philosopher and mathematician who was a student of Ammonius Hermiae. Two works of his survive:

- Commentary on Aristotle's Metaphysics, books I-VII (In Aristotelis metaphysicorum libros Α - Ζ (1 - 7) commentaria, ed. Michael Hayduck, Commentaria in Aristotelem Graeca, VI.2, Berin: Reiner, 1888).
- Commentary on Nicomachus' Introduction to Arithmetic (Leonardo Tarán, Asclepius of Tralles, Commentary to Nicomachus' Introduction to Arithmetic, Transactions of the American Philosophical Society (n.s.), 59: 4. Philadelphia, 1969.

Both works seem to be notes on the lectures conducted by Ammonius.

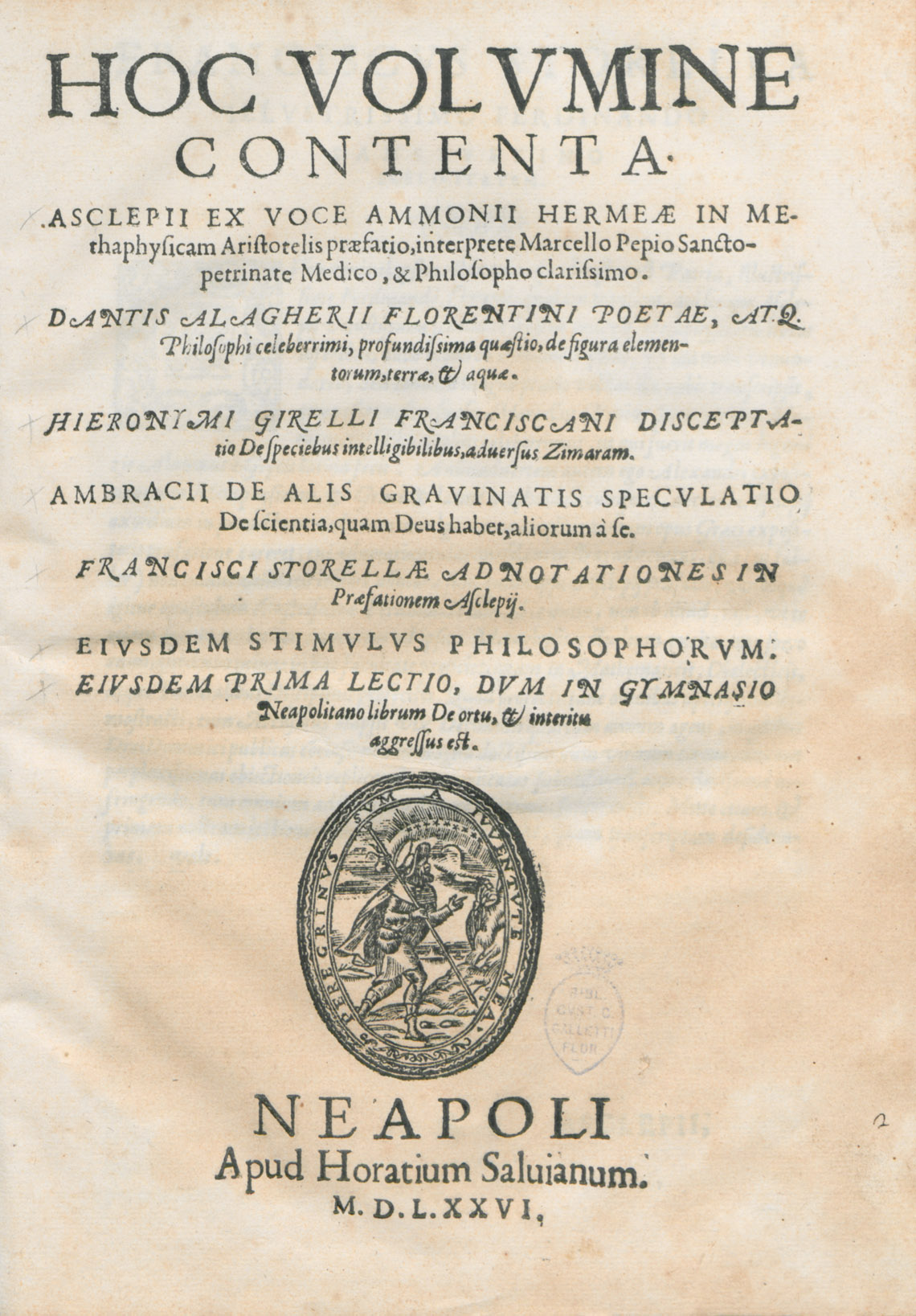
In Aristotelis Metaphysicorum libros, 1576 (commentary on Aristotle's Metaphysics)
