= University of Évora =

Public university in Évora, Portugal

- Universidade de Évora
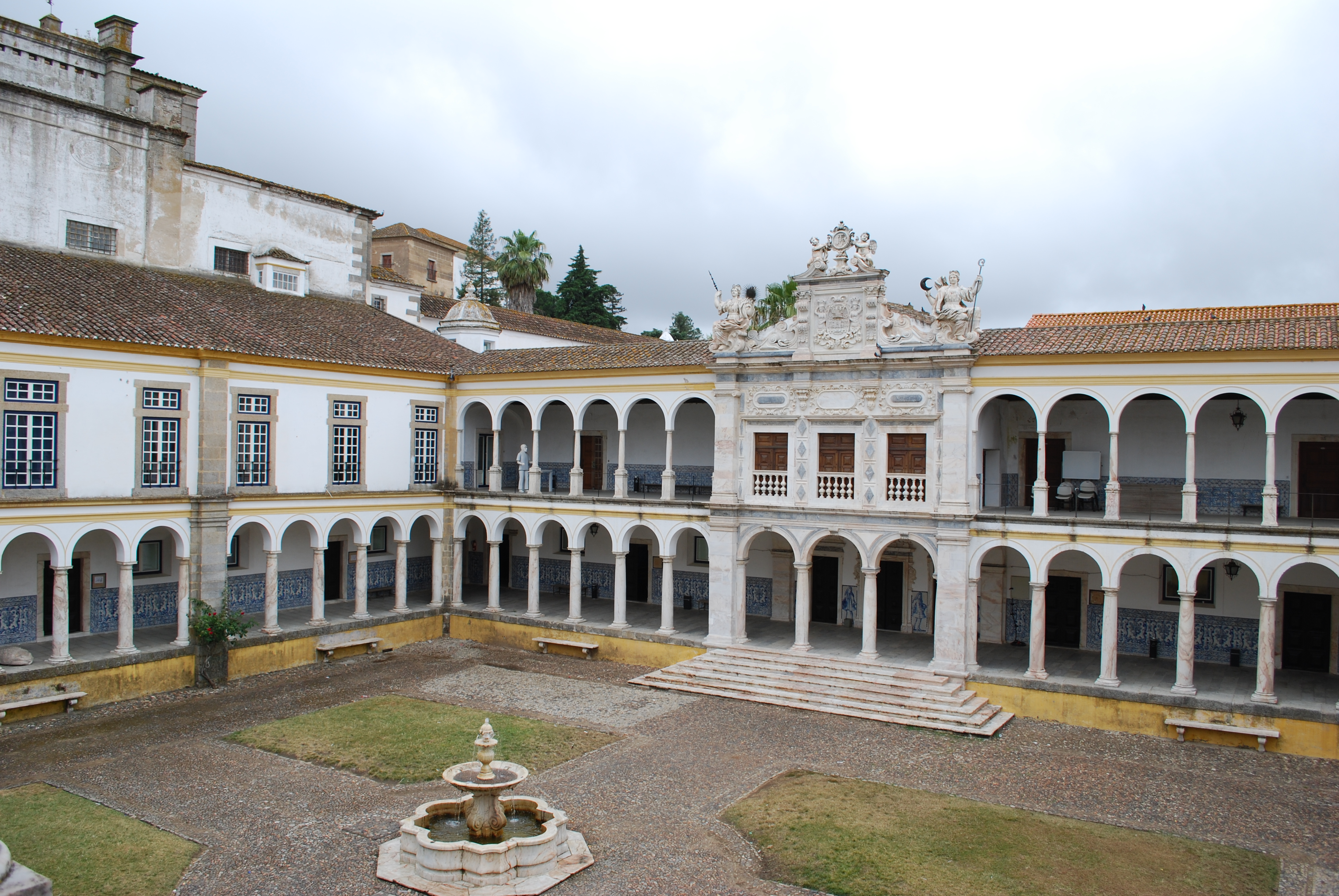
- Latin: Universitas Eborensis
- Former names: Universidade do Espírito Santo; Instituto Universitário de Évora
- Motto: Honesto estudo com longa experiência misturado
- Motto in English: Honest study mixed with long experience
- Type: Public university
- Established: 1559; 467 years ago 1973^{a}
- Affiliations: Compostela Group; EUA; UNIMED
- Rector: Ana Costa Freitas
- Students: 7,800
- Location: Évora, Portugal; 38.5731°N 7.9044°W
- Campus: Urban
- Colours: burgundy and white
- Website: uevora.pt
- ^{a} Reestablished after its closure in 1779.

The University of Évora (Portuguese: Universidade de Évora) is a public university in Évora, Portugal. It is the second-oldest university in the country, established in 1559 by the cardinal Henry, and it received University status in April of the same year from Pope Paul IV, as documented in his Cum a nobis papal bull. Running under the aegis of the Society of Jesus (also known as Jesuits) meant that the university was a target of the Marquis of Pombal's Jesuit oppression, being closed down permanently in 1779 and its masters either incarcerated or exiled.

It was reopened nearly two hundred years later in 1973 as Instituto Universitário de Évora (University Institute of Évora) by the decree of the Minister of Education, José Veiga Simão, in the site of the older university, as part of a set of education policies during the early 1970s that were attempting to reshape Portuguese higher education. Six years later, in 1979, the name was changed to Universidade de Évora.

== History ==
The University of Évora, the second-oldest in Portugal, was founded in the 16th century by the Archbishop of Évora Cardinal Infante Dom Henrique, future king of Portugal, and the Pope Paul IV. Its administrative control was granted to the newly formed Society of Jesus. This measure could be seen as part of Henry's policies to attract Jesuits to the kingdom.

The Jesuit college in Évora operated between 1559 and 1759, when it was surrounded by cavalry troops on February 8 of 1759, as a consequence of the Jesuit banishment promoted by the Minister of the Kingdom Marquis of Pombal.

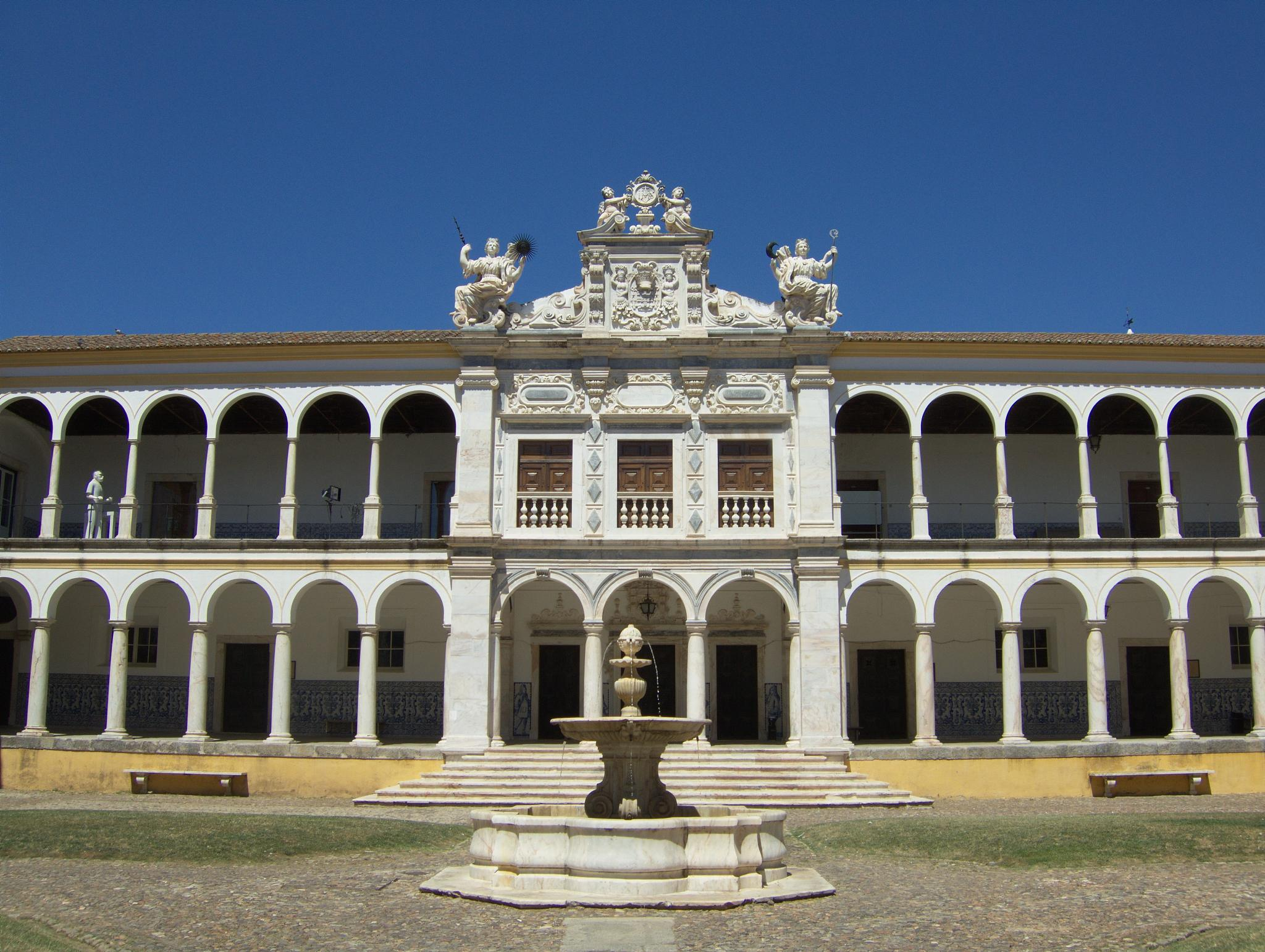
Colégio do Espírito Santo's courtyard

The Colégio do Espírito Santo became famed as a centre of learning and rivalled the University of Coimbra. Among its eminent theologians and philosophers were Luis de Molina (1535-1600), Pedro de Fonseca (1528-1599), St. Francisco de Borja, St. João de Brito, Manuel Álvares. Several prelates of the Portuguese Empire were trained at this university: D. Afonso Mendes, Patriarch of Abyssinia, and D. Pedro Martins, first bishop of Japan. The classrooms are decorated with appropriate azulejos (ceramic tiles) such as "Plato teaching his followers" and "Aristotle teaching Alexander the Great".

The University of Évora resumed work in 1973 as a state-run university. The diplomas are granted in the 18th century Baroque chapel (Sala dos Actos) (restored in 1973), that dominates the Tuscan-arched Renaissance cloister.

== See also ==
- List of early modern universities in Europe
- List of Jesuit sites
- List of universities in Portugal
- Higher education in Portugal
