= Ammonius Hermiae =

5th-century Greek philosopher

- Born: c. 440 AD; Alexandria
- Died: 517–526 AD
- Relatives: Hermias (father); Aedesia (mother); Heliodorus (brother)

Education
- Academic advisor: Proclus

Philosophical work
- Era: Ancient philosophy
- Region: Western philosophy
- School: Neoplatonism
- Notable students: Asclepius of Tralles; Damascius; John Philoponus; Olympiodorus the Younger; Simplicius of Cilicia

Ammonius Hermiae (/əˈmoʊniəs/; Ancient Greek: Ἀμμώνιος ὁ Ἑρμείου, romanized: Ammōnios ho Hermeiou, lit. 'Ammonius, son of Hermias'; c. 440 – between 517 and 526) was a Greek philosopher from Alexandria, Byzantine Egypt. A Neoplatonist, he was the son of the philosophers Hermias and Aedesia, the brother of Heliodorus of Alexandria and the grandson of Syrianus. Ammonius was a pupil of Proclus in Roman Athens, and taught at Alexandria for most of his life, having obtained a public chair in the 470s.

According to Olympiodorus the Younger's Commentaries on Plato's Gorgias and Phaedo texts, Ammonius gave lectures on the works of Plato, Aristotle, and Porphyry of Tyre, and wrote commentaries on Aristotelian works and three lost commentaries on Platonic texts. He is also the author of a text on the astrolabe published in the Catalogus Codicum Astrologorum Graecorum, and lectured on astronomy and geometry. Ammonius taught numerous Neoplatonists, including Damascius, Olympiodorus the Younger, John Philoponus, Simplicius of Cilicia, and Asclepius of Tralles. Also among his pupils were the physician Gessius of Petra and the ecclesiastical historian Zacharias Rhetor, who became the bishop of Mytilene.

As part of the persecution of pagans in the late Roman Empire, the Alexandrian school was investigated by the Roman imperial authorities; Ammonius made a compromise with the Patriarch of Alexandria, Peter III, voluntarily limiting his teaching in return for keeping his own position. This alienated a number of his colleagues and pupils, including Damascius, who nonetheless called him "the greatest commentator who ever lived" in his own Life of Isidore of Alexandria.

== Life ==
Ammonius' father Hermias died when he was a child, and his mother Aedesia raised him and his brother Heliodorus in Alexandria. When they reached adulthood, Aedesia accompanied her sons to Athens where they studied under Proclus. Eventually, they returned to Alexandria where Ammonius, as head of the Neoplatonist school in the city, lectured on Plato and Aristotle for the rest of his life. According to Damascius, during the persecution of the pagans at Alexandria in the late 480s, Ammonius made concessions to the Christian authorities so that he could continue his lectures. Damascius, who scolds Ammonius for the agreement that he made, does not say what the concessions were, but they may have involved limitations on the doctrines he could teach or promote. He was still teaching in 515; Olympiodorus heard him lecture on Plato's Gorgias in that year. He was also an accomplished astronomer; he lectured on Ptolemy and is known to have written a treatise on the astrolabe.

== Writings ==
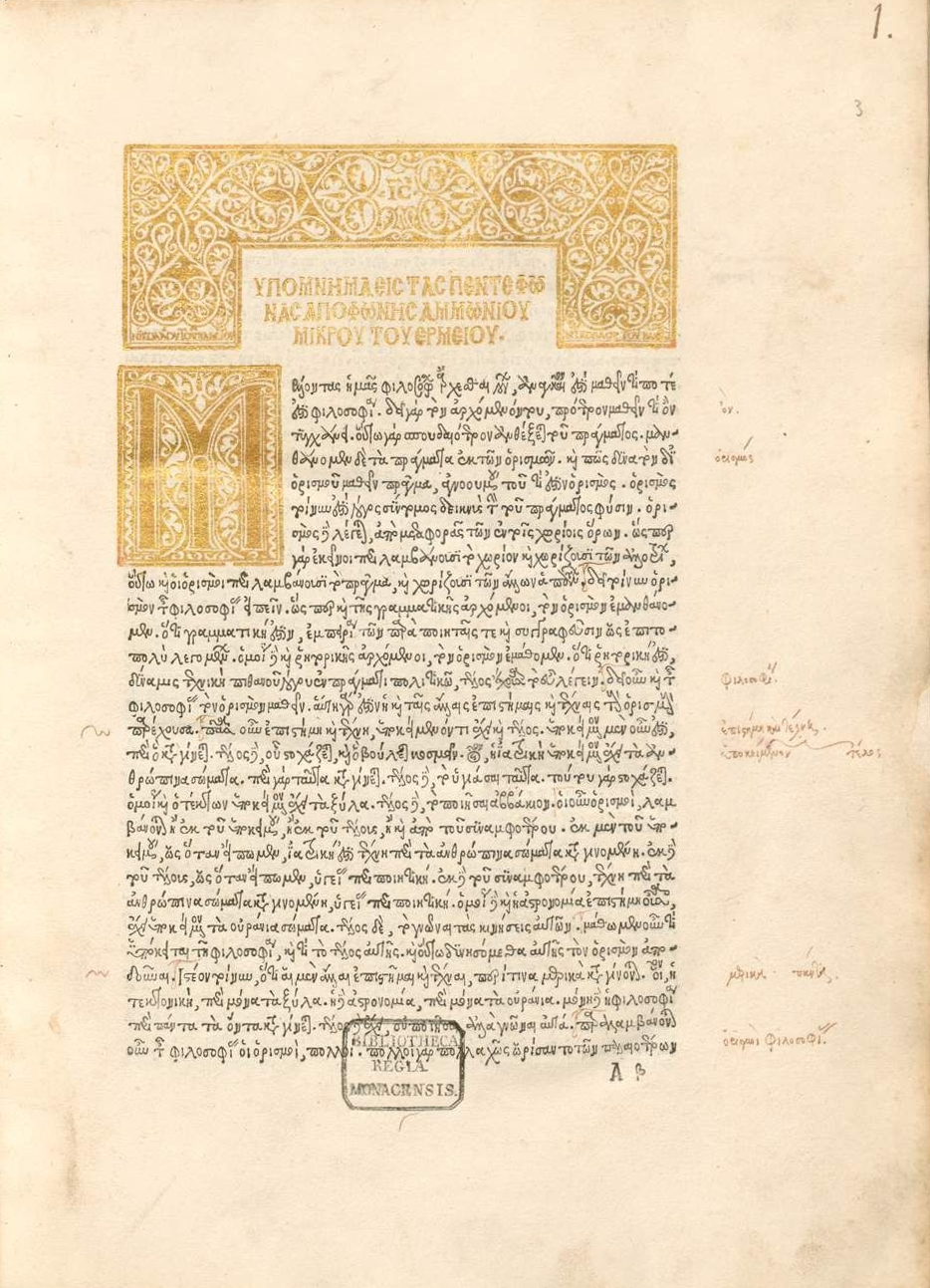
First page of the first edition of the Isagoge commentary, Venice 1500

Of his reputedly numerous writings, only his commentary on Aristotle's De Interpretatione survives intact. A commentary on Porphyry's Isagoge may also be his, but it is somewhat corrupt and contains later interpolations.

In De Interpretatione, Ammonius contends that divine foreknowledge makes void the contingent. Like Boethius in his second Commentary and in The Consolation of Philosophy, this argument maintains the effectiveness of prayer. Ammonius cites Iamblichus, who said "knowledge is intermediate between the knower and the known, since it is the activity of the knower concerning the known."

In addition, there are some notes of Ammonius' lectures written by various students which also survive:

- On Aristotle's Categories (anonymous writer)
- On Aristotle's Prior Analytics I (anonymous writer)
- On Aristotle's Metaphysics 1–7 (written by Asclepius)
- On Nicomachus' Introduction to Arithmetic (written by Asclepius)
- On Aristotle's Prior Analytics (written by John Philoponus)
- On Aristotle's Posterior Analytics (written by John Philoponus)
- On Aristotle's On Generation and Corruption (written by John Philoponus)
- On Aristotle's On the Soul (written by John Philoponus)

There is Greek-language work called Life of Aristotle, which is usually ascribed to Ammonius, but "is more probable that it is the work of Joannes Philoponus, the pupil of Ammonius, to whom it is ascribed in some MSS."

== Legacy ==
In 1976, the lunar crater Ammonius was named after him.

== English translations ==
- Ammonius: On Aristotle Categories, translated by S. M. Cohen and G. B. Matthews. London and Ithaca 1992.
- Ammonius: On Aristotle's On Interpretation 1–8, translated by D. Blank. London and Ithaca 1996.
- Ammonius: On Aristotle's On Interpretation 9, with Boethius: On Aristotle's On Interpretation 9, translated by D. Blank (Ammonius) and N. Kretzmann (Boethius). London and Ithaca 1998.
- John Philoponus: On Aristotle On Coming-to-be and Perishing 1.1–5, translated by C. J. F. Williams. London and Ithaca 1999.
- John Philoponus: On Aristotle On Coming-to-be and Perishing 1.6–2.4, translated by C. J. F. Williams. London and Ithaca 1999.
- John Philoponus: On Aristotle On the Soul 2.1–6, translated by W. Charlton. London and Ithaca 2005.
- John Philoponus: On Aristotle On the Soul 2.7–12, translated by W. Charlton. London and Ithaca 2005.
- John Philoponus: On Aristotle On the Soul 3.1–8, translated by W. Charlton. London and Ithaca 2000.
- John Philoponus: On Aristotle On the Intellect (de Anima 3.4–8), translated by W. Charlton. London and Ithaca 1991.
- Ammonius: Interpretation of Porphyry's Introduction to Aristotle's Five Terms, translated by Michael Chase. London and New York 2020.
