= Heliodorus of Alexandria =

Greek philosopher and astronomer

Heliodorus of Alexandria (Greek: Ἡλιόδωρος) was a Neoplatonic philosopher who lived in the 5th century AD. He was the son of Hermias and Aedesia, and the younger brother of Ammonius. His father, Hermias, died when he was young, and his mother, Aedesia, raised him and his brother in their home city of Alexandria until they were old enough to go to philosophy school. Aedesia took them to Athens where they studied under Proclus. Eventually they returned to Alexandria, where they both taught philosophy. Damascius, who was taught by Heliodorus, describes him as less gifted than his elder brother, and more superficial in his character and studies.

He cannot be the author of a commentary on the Astrology of Paulus Alexandrinus which was written after 564, which is ascribed to another Heliodorus.
