= Hermias (philosopher) =

Greek philosopher

Hermias (/hɜːrˈmaɪəs/; Ancient Greek: Ἑρμείας, Hermeias; c. 410 – before 470 AD) was a Neoplatonic philosopher who was born in Alexandria.

He went to Athens and studied philosophy under Syrianus. He married Aedesia, who was a relative of Syrianus, and who had originally been betrothed to Proclus, but Proclus broke the engagement off after receiving a divine warning. Hermias brought Syrianus' teachings back to Alexandria, where he lectured in the school of Horapollo, receiving an income from the state. He died some time before 470 AD, at a time when his children, Ammonius and Heliodorus, were still small. Aedesia, however, continued to receive an income from the state in order to raise the children, enabling them to become philosophers.

A Commentary on the Phaedrus written by Hermias survives. It consists of notes based on the lectures conducted by Syrianus concerning Plato's Phaedrus.
