= Syrianus =

5th-century Greek Neoplatonic philosopher

- Born: Alexandria
- Died: c. 437 AD; Athens

Education
- Academic advisor: Plutarch of Athens

Philosophical work
- Era: Ancient philosophy
- Region: Western philosophy
- School: Neoplatonism
- Notable students: Domninus of Larissa; Hermias of Alexandria; Proclus
- Main interests: Metaphysics, epistemology

Syrianus (Ancient Greek: Συριανός, Syrianos; died c. 437 AD) was a Greek Neoplatonic philosopher, and head of Plato's Academy in Athens, succeeding his teacher Plutarch of Athens in 431/432 AD. He is important as the teacher of Proclus, and, like Plutarch of Athens and Proclus, as a commentator on Plato and Aristotle. His best-known extant work is a commentary on the Metaphysics of Aristotle. He is said to have written also on the De Caelo and the De Interpretatione of Aristotle and on Plato's Timaeus.

== Life ==
He was a native of Alexandria, Egypt and the son of Philoxenus. We know little of his personal history, but that he came to Athens, and studied with great zeal under Plutarch of Athens, the head of the Neoplatonist school, who regarded him with great admiration and affection, and appointed him as his successor. He is important as the teacher of Proclus and Hermias. Proclus regarded him with the greatest veneration, and gave directions that at his death he should be buried in the same tomb with Themistius.

== Writings ==
Only a little remains of the writings of Syrianus, the surviving works are:

- A Commentary on Aristotle's Metaphysics.
- Commentaries on two rhetorical works by Hermogenes.
- Lectures on Plato's Phaedrus, preserved by Hermias.

Among the lost works, Syrianus wrote commentaries on Aristotle's De Caelo and De Interpretatione. We learn from the commentary of Proclus on the Timaeus of Plato that Syrianus also wrote a commentary on the same book. Syrianus also wrote works on The Theology of Orpheus, and On the Harmony of Orpheus, Pythagoras and Plato with the Oracles. Theodorus Meliteniota, in his Prooemium in Astronomiam, mentions commentaries on the Magna Syntaxis of Ptolemy by the philosopher Syrianus. The Suda attributes several works to Syrianus, but which are in fact the works of Proclus.

== Philosophy ==
Syrianus' philosophical significance lies in the field of metaphysics and the exegesis of Plato. He is important in expanding the details of the Neoplatonist metaphysical system begun by Iamblichus and most completely delineated by Proclus.

The most valuable remains that we possess are the commentaries on the Metaphysics of Aristotle. In explaining the propositions of Aristotle, he appends the views held by the Neoplatonist school on the subject in hand, and endeavours to establish the latter against the former. In his Metaphysics commentary Syrianus explains his view of the Monad and the Dyad in a number of places. The One is immediately followed by a supreme monad and dyad. Syrianus describes the monad as masculine and the dyad as feminine. He employs the doctrine of the two cosmic principles to explain the origin of evil. He denies that there are Platonic forms of things which are evil or base. The dyad is indirectly responsible for evil. Syrianus attributes the existence of evil to otherness and plurality, which he believes the dyad is directly responsible for creating.

One of his fundamental principles is that it is a proposition of general applicability that the same cannot be both affirmed and denied at the same time of the same thing; but that in any sense involving the truth of either the affirmation or the denial of a proposition, it applies only to existing things, but not to that which transcends speech and knowledge, for this admits neither of affirmation nor of denial, since every assertion respecting it must be false. On the whole, the doctrines laid down in this work are those of the Neoplatonist school.

== Editions ==
- J. Dillon, D. O'Meara, (2006), Syrianus: On Aristotle Metaphysics 13-14. Duckworth.
- D. O'Meara, J. Dillon, (2008), Syrianus: On Aristotle Metaphysics 3-4. Duckworth.

== Sources ==
- Angela Longo (ed.), Syrianus et la métaphysique de l'antiquité tardive: actes du colloque international, Université de Genève, 29 septembre-1er octobre 2006. (Napoli, Bibliopolis, 2009) (Elenchos, 51).
- Sarah Klitenic Wear, The Teachings of Syrianus on Plato's Timaeus and Parmenides. Ancient Mediterranean and Medieval Texts and Contexts (Leiden; Boston: Brill, 2011) (Studies in Platonism, Neoplatonism and the Platonic tradition, 10).
