= Meteorology (Aristotle) =

Treatise by Aristotle

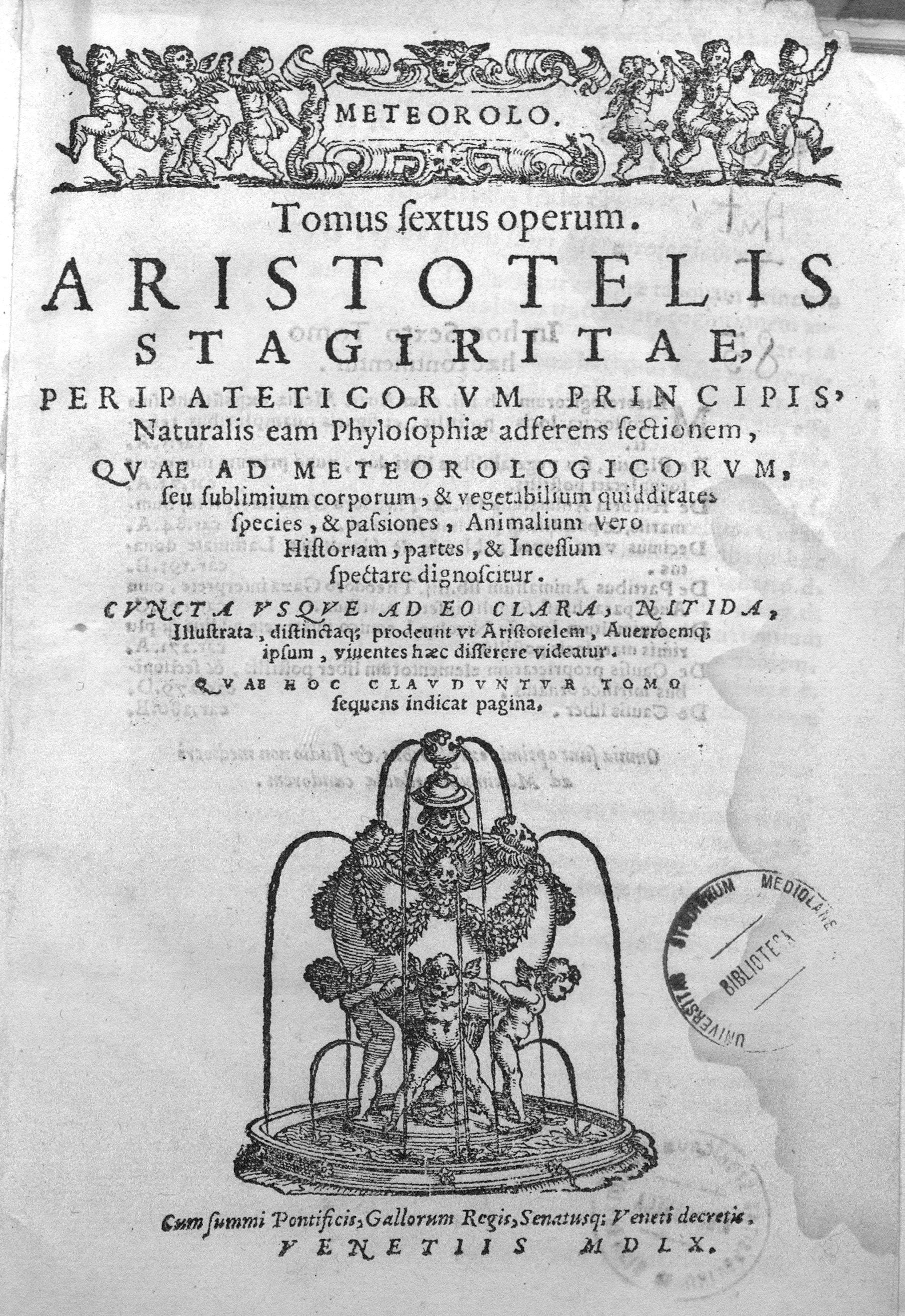
Meteorologica, print of Latin translation in 1560

Meteorology (Greek: Μετεωρολογικά; Latin: Meteorologica or Meteora) is a treatise by Aristotle. The text discusses what Aristotle believed to have been all the affections common to air and water, and the kinds and parts of the Earth and the affections of its parts. It includes early accounts of water evaporation, earthquakes, and other weather phenomena.

Aristotle's Meteorologica is the oldest comprehensive treatise on the subject of meteorology. Written around 340 B.C, it consists of four books; three pertaining to meteorology, and one to chemistry. Despite its ancient origins, Meteorologica was the basis for all modern day meteorology texts throughout Western Civilization up to the 17th century.

Throughout this treatise, Aristotle outlines two theories:

1. The universe is spherical
  1. The Earth’s inner core is composed by the orbits of heavenly bodies
  2. The universe has two regions; the celestial (region past the Moon’s orbit) and the terrestrial region-sphere (the Moon’s tendency to orbit around the Earth)
  3. From this theory, Aristotle achieved a distinction between what was understood (astronomy) and his new findings (meteorology)
2. The "Four-element Theory"
  1. The terrestrial region was composed of the four elements: water, earth, fire, and air
  2. These elements were arranged in spherical strata, with Earth as its center and the Moon on the outskirts of the sphere
  3. They were in constant interchange with one another, e.g: heat from the Sun collides with cold water, creating air and mist

Meteorologica does not only contain the theories of Ancient Greeks, but is the accumulation of the findings from poets, philosophers, historians, etc.

Throughout his treatise, Aristotle is methodical and consistent while presenting his findings. First, he introduces the topic by presenting the theories of other scholars. By refuting or supporting their claims, Aristotle shapes his own assertions. Scholars such as Anaxagoras derived many of their theories on inferences, strongly basing their discoveries on observations rather than fact. In comparison, Aristotle approached his research by drawing deductive inferences when examining his theories. While formulating his hypotheses, he preconceived his theories based on observed weather phenomena. In lieu of using weather observations to develop his findings, he interpreted these observations to support his hypotheses.

An Arabic compendium of Meteorology, called al-'Athar al-`Ulwiyyah (Arabic: الآثار العلوية) and produced c. 800 CE by the Antiochene scholar Yahya ibn al-Batriq, was widely circulated among Muslim scholars over the following centuries. This was translated into Latin by Gerard of Cremona in the 12th century – and by this means, during the Twelfth-century Renaissance, entered the Western European world of medieval scholasticism. Gerard's "old translation" (vetus translatio) was superseded by an improved text by William of Moerbeke, the nova translatio, which was widely read, as it survives in numerous manuscripts; it received commentary by Thomas Aquinas and was often printed during the Renaissance.

== Physics ==
In On the Universe (a possibly spurious work), Aristotle writes:

...the motion of these latter bodies [of four] being of two kinds: either from the centre or to the centre. (339a14-15)
So we must treat fire and earth and the elements like them as the material causes of the events in this world (meaning by material what is subject and is affected), but must assign causality in the sense of the originating principle of motion to the influence of the eternally moving bodies. (339a27-32)

This is a reference to the unmoved movers, a teleological explanation. Although On the Universe is included in the Corpus Aristotelicum, its status as a genuine Aristotelian text is disputed.

== Four elements ==
...four bodies are fire, air, water, earth. (339a15-16)
Fire occupies the highest place among them all, earth the lowest, and two elements correspond to these in their relation to one another, air being nearest to fire, water to earth. (339a16-19)
Fire, air, water, earth, we assert, originate from one another, and each of them exists potentially in each, as all things do that can be resolved into a common and ultimate substrate. (339a36-b2)

All terrestrial matter consists of these four elements. Various ratios of the elements combine to create the diverse materials found in nature. Aristotle explains this in terms of the four primary contrary qualities, heat, cold, dryness, and moisture (Meteorology book 4 chapter 7); the first two being active causes and the latter being the underlying matter (378b10). Compositions of the elements in things like milk, blood, flesh, or metals will include both earth and water, and sometimes air. These composite bodies involve a form which combines contraries in the same body, i.e. both moisture and dryness (Aristotle explained the flexibility and ductility of metal by theorizing that it had moisture in its composition). They do so by forming proportions among the contraries. Flesh involves all four elements in a proportioned combination.

The theory of elements was meant to replace the Atomism of Democritus (which Aristotle refuted in On Generation and Corruption and De Caelo). The elements were not, therefore, tiny building blocks like atoms, but rather the constitutive properties (i.e. contraries) of the simple bodies (fire, air, water, earth) found in sense-perception.

Meteorology deals primarily with the interaction of three elements: air, water, and earth. A cloud is a composite that mixes all three. Books 1-3 of Meteorology apply a method of explanation (contrary qualities) which explains different phenomena as an interaction of forces in a natural system (relations of agent and patient, potency, and activity). Thus the sun and air are "movers" within meteorological phenomena, while water and earth are "moved" and act as matter. Book 4 is a sustained investigation of the properties and effects of heat and cold on organic processes.

== Atmosphere ==
=== Water vapor ===
Some of the vapour that is formed by day does not rise high because the ratio of the fire that is raising it to the water that is being raised is small. (347a13-15)
Both dew and hoar-frost are found when the sky is clear and there is no wind. For the vapour could not be raised unless the sky were clear, and if a wind were blowing it could not condense. (347a26-28)
...hoar-frost is not found on mountains contributes to prove that these phenomena occur because the vapour does not rise high. One reason for this is that it rises from hollow and watery places, so that the heat that is raising it, bearing as it were too heavy a burden cannot lift it to a great height but soon lets it fall again. (347a29-34)

=== Weather ===
When there is a great quantity of exhalation and it is rare and is squeezed out in the cloud itself we get a thunderbolt. (371a17-19)
So the whirlwind originates in the failure of an incipient hurricane to escape from its cloud: it is due to the resistance which generates the eddy, and it consists in the spiral which descends to the earth and drags with it the cloud which it cannot shake off. It moves things by its wind in the direction in which it is blowing in a straight line, and whirls round by its circular motion and forcibly snatches up whatever it meets. (371a9-15)

Aristotle describes the properties of tornadoes and lightning.

== Geology ==
So it is clear, since there will be no end to time and the world is eternal, that neither the Tanais nor the Nile has always been flowing, but that the region whence they flow was once dry: for their effect may be fulfilled, but time cannot. And this will be equally true of all other rivers. But if rivers come into existence and perish and the same parts of the earth were not always moist, the sea must needs change correspondingly. And if the sea is always advancing in one place and receding in another it is clear that the same parts of the whole earth are not always either sea or land, but that all this changes in course of time.. (353a14-24)

== Geography ==
To judge from what is known from journeys by sea and land, the length [of the inhabited earth] is much greather than the width; indeed the distance from the pillars of Heracles [at Cadiz] to India exceeds that from Aethiopia [Sudan] to Lake Maeotis [Sea of Azov] and the farthest part of Scythia is the proportion of more than five to three (362b19-23)

== Hydrology ==
The Red Sea, for instance, communicates but slightly with the ocean outside the straits,... (354a1-3)
The whole of the Mediterranean does actually flow. The direction of this flow is determined by the depth of the basins and by the number of rivers. Maeotis flows into Pontus and Pontus into the Aegean. After that the flow of the remaining seas is not so easy to observe. (354a11-14)

== Spherical Earth ==
The earth is surrounded by water, just as that is by the sphere of air, and that again by the sphere called that of fire. (354b23-25)

Aristotle is describing a spherical lithosphere (Earth), hydrosphere (water) and atmosphere (air and fire).

== Book 1 ==
The following is the table of contents of the first book:

Ch. 1 Introduction to meteorology

Ch.2 General principles and elements in relation to the world and universe

Ch.3 Composition of the four elements; air, earth, fire, and water. Topics also include the composition of the space between moon and stars, the double nature of exhalation, and the composition of clouds. This chapter also contains Anaxagoras' analysis of the element ether

Ch.4 Shooting Stars

Ch.5 The Aurora Borealis and its affects

Ch.6 Comets, including the analyses of Anaxagoras, Democritus, the Pythagoreans. Refutation of these findings by Hippocrates of Chios and Aeschylus

Ch.7 Comets, their nature and causes

Ch.8 The Milky Way, including Aristotle's new theory

Ch.9 The formation of rain, mist, and clouds

Ch.10 Dew and hoar-frost

Ch.11 Rain, snow, hail and their connection to hoar-frost

Ch.12 Hail, why it occurs in the summer and disputing Anaxagoras' theories

Ch.13 Winds, formation of rivers

Ch.14 Climatic changes and coast erosion

== Book 2 ==
The following is the table of contents of the second book:

Ch. 1 The ocean and its nature

Ch.2 & Ch.3 Sea saltiness, its evaporation, its immiscibility and its origins

Ch.4 Winds, their causes and effects

Ch.5 Winds, effects of heat and cold on winds

Ch.6 Winds and their directions

Ch.7 Earthquakes, and the views and contradictions of Anaxagoras, Democritus, and Anaximenes

Ch.8 Earthquakes and their causes

Ch.9 Thunder and lightning, causes and theories from Empedocles and Anaxagoras

== Book 3 ==
The following is the table of contents of the third book:

Ch. 1 Hurricanes, typhoons, fire winds and thunderbolts

Ch.2 Haloes and rainbows

Ch.3 Haloes and their shapes

Ch.4 Rainbows and their forms

Ch.5 Rainbows continued

Ch.6 Mock suns and rods

== Book 4 ==
The authorship of the fourth book is disputed. This is due partially to its content. It deals with an altogether different set of questions from the other three books, and is much more similar to On Generation and Corruption. According to H. B. Gottschalk:

The so-called fourth book of Aristotle's Meteorologica is not about meteorological phenomena at all. It describes the formation out of the four elements of 'homoeomerous' substances, by which are meant minerals such as stones and metals, and organic substances like flesh, skin, and hair, and the changes they can undergo under the influence of heat, cold, and moisture.

— H. B. Gottschalk, The Authorship of Meteorologica, Book IV

Ingeborg Hammer-Jensen and Léon Robin argued for Strato of Lampsacus, a disciple of Aristotle, as the potential author of the work. Recently, its authenticity, or at the very least, its consistency with other Aristotelian texts, has been defended. Where exactly it should be placed in the corpus is another question. Alexander placed it with GC (On Generation and Corruption), but thought it was a different work from it. Olympiodorus placed it between Cael. (De Caelo, On the Heavens) and GC, while Patrizi placed it before Parts of Animals. Only Ammonius claims it is both genuine and in the right place.

The fourth book consists of a detailed investigation of organic and natural processes, and attempts to explain the interaction and composition of elements by reference to the contrary physical qualities. It also provides a theory of secondary qualities, which emerge from different compositions of the primary qualities. This means that hardness or brittleness are due to the underlying relations between the primary contraries (hot, cold, dry, and moist).

Chapter analysis:

1. Summary of the doctrine of four prime contraries (hot, cold, moist, dry) and their relation to the four elements (fire, air, water, earth). Hot and cold are the active factors responsible for generation and destruction.
2. Two and Three are an investigation of the effects of heat and cold on natural processes, in particular, concoction [πέψις]. Concoction is defined as the maturing process [τελέωσις] of a substance which initiates its own development by means of an inner heat, i.e. it is its own internal moving cause (379b18-25). The appropriate heat will "masters the indeterminacy" of the material elements, so as to give them form (380a1). Proper concoction is a sign of health (380a2).
3. Ripening is a specific kind of concoction [πέψις τις]: the process in which the nourishing elements in fruit attains maturity so that its seeds can produce life (380a11-15). Aristotle says we can speak metaphorically about other processes as maturation [τελέωσις], all processes in which "matter is determined by natural heat and cold" (280a18-22). The chapter then examines rawness as the antithesis of concoction: in-concoction of the nourishing element in fruit having indeterminate moisture (380a27-b13). He then investigates related processes in which external influences effect the inner equilibrium of forces in natural compounds: boiling, scalding, and roasting.
4. Four through Nine are an investigation of the passive factors, moisture and dryness, and develop a systematic explanation of their secondary properties, the primary two being hard and soft.
5. Aristotle says that hard and soft are produced by processes of solidification or liquefaction that are due to heat and coldness. Drying is one kind of solidification.
6. Further investigation of solidification and liquefaction. (1) watery liquids, which are solidified by cold, liquefied by heat. (2) In mixtures of earth and water (which may also thicken instead of solidifying), either earth dominates, or, in which water dominates.
7. Discussion of particular examples: cheese, milk, blood, stones, wood, ebony, clay. Conclusion: anything that will solidify or thicken contains earth.
8. Summary of his theories of hylomorphism and motion, as pertaining to the study of the physical properties of natural bodies. We are then given a list of the types of qualities that arise from the interactions between composite bodies. These are the effects of heat and cold on the passive components (moisture and dryness). The list is given in the form of a pair of opposites: "Capable or incapable of..."
  - Solidification or melting
  - Softening from heat or softening from cold
  - Bending or breaking
  - Fragmentation or impression
  - Plasticity or being squeezed
  - Ductility or malleability
  - Fissility or being cut
  - Viscosity or being compressed
  - Combustability or giving off fumes
9. Further investigation of the nature of solidification and softening. Examples: bronze, soda, salt, wool, grain. Then all 18 properties are investigated.
10. Discusses homoiomerous bodies and the effects of heat and cold on the processes of solidification and liquification.
11. Discusses examples (bronze, gold, silver, tin, iron, stone, flesh, bone sinew, skin, intestine, hair, fiber, veins) which are differentiated from non-homoiomerous bodies: everything composed of homoiomerous bodies, e.g. face, hand, foot, or wood, bark, leaf, root.
12. Discusses non-homoiomerous bodies. In the middle of the chapter he insists on the existence of functions [ἔργον] and purposes [ἕνεκα] in all natural processes, claiming they are only clearer in the case of living things like flesh, but no less present in inanimate nature (390a17). Despite this insistence on final causality, the author goes on immediately to claim that all homoiomerous bodies can be produced by heat, cold, or their combination. The chapter ends the book by looking ahead to a further investigation of homoiomerous bodies (blood, flesh, semen, and the rest), which would lead into the study of non-homoiomerous, and then to bodies composed of them "such as humans, plants, and the like." (390b24).

== See also ==
- Classical compass winds
- History of science
- Mpemba effect
- Timeline of meteorology
