= Metaphysics (Aristotle) =

One of the principal works of Aristotle

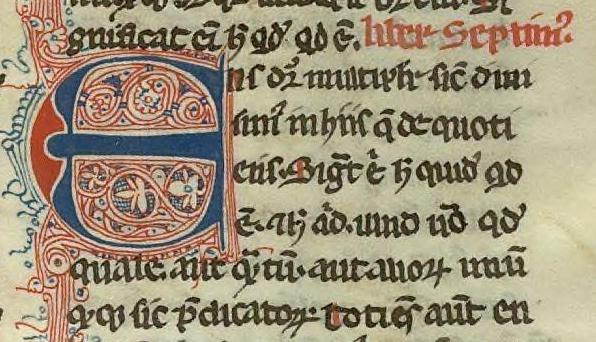
Book 7 of the Metaphysics: from a manuscript of William of Moerbeke's translation

Metaphysics (Greek: τὰ μετὰ τὰ φυσικά, "those after the physics"; Latin: Metaphysica) is one of the principal works of Aristotle, in which he develops the doctrine that he calls First Philosophy. (Note: sometimes referred to as Wisdom, sometimes as First Philosophy, and sometimes as Theology) The work is a compilation of various texts treating abstract subjects, notably substance theory, different kinds of causation, form and matter, the existence of mathematical objects and the cosmos, which together constitute much of the branch of philosophy later known as metaphysics.

== Date, style and composition ==
Many of Aristotle's works are extremely compressed, and many scholars believe that in their current form, they are likely lecture notes. Subsequent to the arrangement of Aristotle's works by Andronicus of Rhodes in the first century BC, a number of his treatises were referred to as the writings "after ("meta") the Physics" (Note: μετὰ τὰ φυσικά), the origin of the current title for the collection Metaphysics. Some scholars, such as Eduard Zeller, Werner Jaeger, and Jonathan Barnes, have interpreted the expression “meta” to imply that the subject of the work goes “beyond” that of Aristotle’s Physics or that it is metatheoretical in relation to the Physics.. But other scholars, including Alexander Grant, W. D. Ross, and contemporary commentators such as those cited in modern bibliographies, believe that “meta” referred simply to the work’s place in the canonical arrangement of Aristotle’s writings, which is at least as old as Andronicus of Rhodes or even Hermippus of Smyrna. In other surviving works of Aristotle, the metaphysical treatises are referred to as "the [writings] concerning first philosophy"; (Note: τὰ περὶ τῆς πρώτης φιλοσοφίας e.g., in Movement of Animals 700b9) which was the term Aristotle used for metaphysics. (Note: He called the study of nature or natural philosophy "second philosophy")

It is notoriously difficult to specify the date at which Aristotle wrote these treatises as a whole or even individually, especially because the Metaphysics is, in Jonathan Barnes' words, "a farrago, a hotch-potch", and more generally because of the difficulty of dating any of Aristotle's writings. The order in which the books were written is not known; their arrangement is due to later editors. In the manuscripts, books are referred to by Greek letters. For many scholars, it is customary to refer to the books by their letter names. Book 1 is called Alpha (Α); 2, little alpha (α); 3, Beta (Β); 4, Gamma (Γ); 5, Delta (Δ); 6, Epsilon (Ε); 7, Zeta (Ζ); 8, Eta (Η); 9, Theta (Θ); 10, Iota (Ι); 11, Kappa (Κ); 12, Lambda (Λ); 13, Mu (Μ); 14, Nu (Ν).

== Outline ==
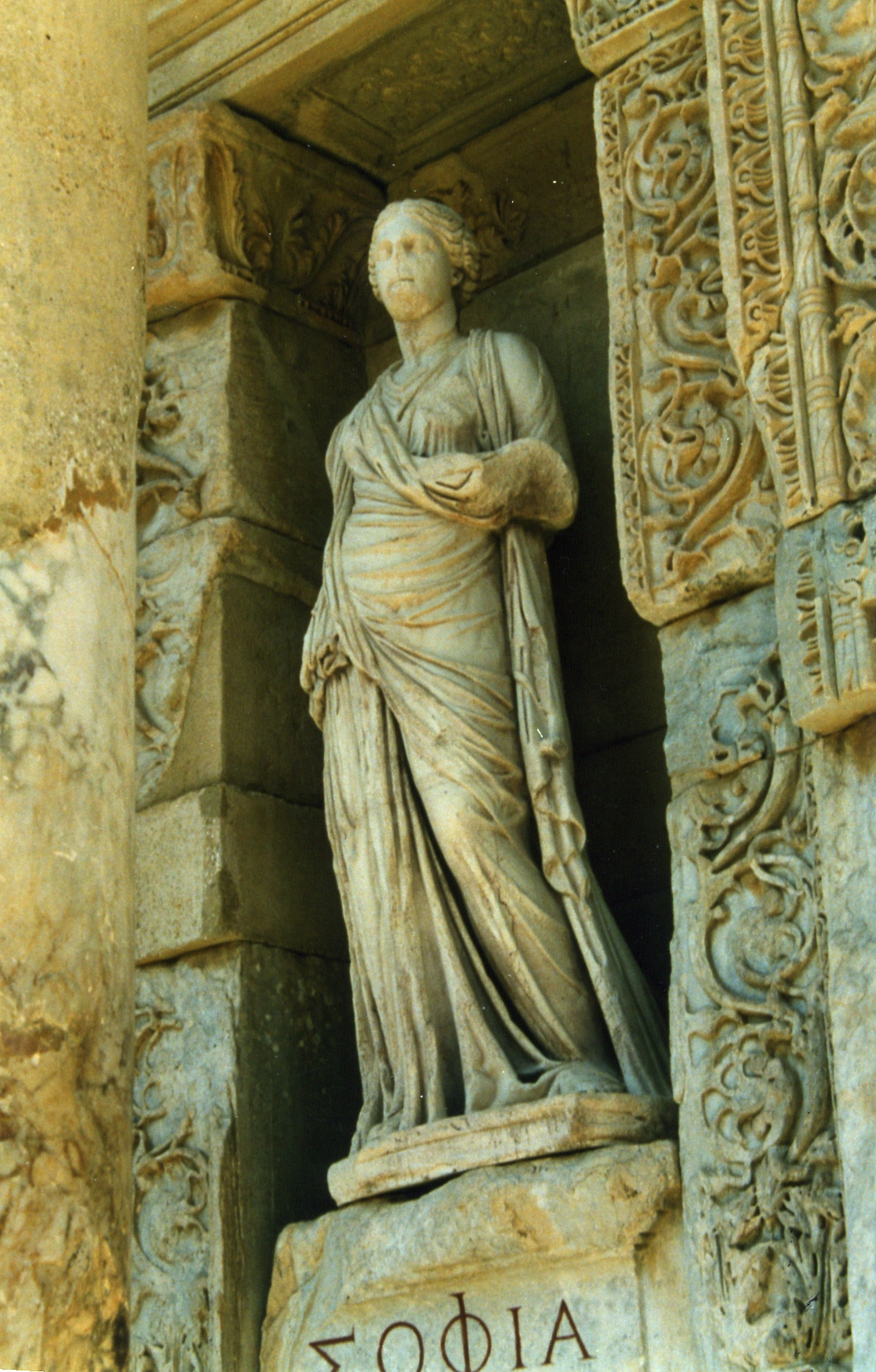
Wisdom personified as a deity in the Library of Celsus in Ephesus. Aristotle discusses the nature of wisdom, or first philosophy, which he defines as the study of first principles and causes.

=== Books I–VI: Alpha, little Alpha, Beta, Gamma, Delta and Epsilon ===
- Book I or Alpha begins by discussing the nature of knowledge and compares knowledge gained from the senses and from memory, arguing that knowledge is acquired from memory through experience. It then defines "wisdom" (sophia) as a knowledge of the first principles (arche) or causes of things. Because those who are wise understand the first principles and causes, they know the why of things, unlike those who only know that things are a certain way based on their memory and sensations. The wise are able to teach because they know the why of things, and so they are better fitted to command, rather than to obey. He then surveys the first principles and causes of previous philosophers, starting with the material monists of the Ionian school and continuing up until Plato.
- Book II or "little alpha": Book II addresses a possible objection to the account of how we understand first principles and thus acquire wisdom, that attempting to discover the first principle would lead to an infinite series of causes. It argues in response that the idea of an infinite causal series is absurd, and argues that only things that are created or destroyed require a cause, and that thus there must be a primary cause that is eternal, an idea he develops later in Book Lambda.
- Book III or Beta lists the main problems or puzzles (aporia) of philosophy.
- Book IV or Gamma: Chapters 2 and 3 argue for its status as a subject in its own right. The rest is a defense of (a) what we now call the principle of contradiction, the principle that it is not possible for the same proposition to be (the case) and not to be (the case), and (b) what we now call the principle of excluded middle: tertium non datur — there cannot be an intermediary between contradictory statements.
- Book V or Delta ("philosophical lexicon") is a list of definitions of about thirty key terms such as cause, nature, one, and many.
- Book VI or Epsilon has two main concerns. The first concern is the hierarchy of the sciences: productive, practical or theoretical. Aristotle considers theoretical sciences superior because they study beings for their own sake—for example, Physics studies beings that can be moved (Note: 1025b27)—and do not have a target (τέλος telos, "end, goal"; τέλειος, "complete, perfect") beyond themselves. He argues that the study of being qua being, or First Philosophy, is superior to all the other theoretical sciences because it is concerned with the ultimate causes of all reality, not just the secondary causes of a part of reality. The second concern of Epsilon is the study of "accidents" (κατὰ συμβεβηκός), those attributes that do not depend on (τέχνη) or exist by necessity, which Aristotle believes do not deserve to be studied as a science.

=== Books VII–IX: Zeta, Eta, and Theta ===
Books Zeta, Eta, and Theta are generally considered the core of the Metaphysics. Book Zeta (VII) begins by stating that "being" has several senses, the purpose of philosophy is to understand the primary kind of being, called substance (ousia) and determine what substances there are, a concept that Aristotle develops in the Categories. Zeta goes on to consider four candidates for substance: (i) the 'essence' or 'what it is to be' of a thing (ii) the universal, (iii) the genus to which a substance belongs and (iv) the material substrate that underlies all the properties of a thing.

- He dismisses the idea that matter can be substance, for if we eliminate everything that is a property from what can have the property, such as matter and the shape, we are left with something that has no properties at all. Such 'ultimate matter' cannot be substance. Separability and 'this-ness' are fundamental to our concept of substance.
- Aristotle then describes his theory that essence is the criterion of substantiality. (Note: Chapter 4-12) The essence of something is what is included in a secundum se ('according to itself') account of a thing, i.e. which tells what a thing is by its very nature. You are not musical by your very nature. But you are a human by your very nature. Your essence is what is mentioned in the definition of you.
- Aristotle then considers, and dismisses, the idea that substance is the universal or the genus, criticizing the Platonic theory of Ideas. (Note: Chapter 13-15)
- Aristotle argues that if genus and species are individual things, then different species of the same genus contain the genus as individual thing, which leads to absurdities. Moreover, individuals are incapable of definition.

Finally, he concludes book Zeta by arguing that substance is really a cause. (Note: Chapter 17)

Book Eta consists of a summary of what has been said so far (i.e., in Book Zeta) about substance, and adds a few further details regarding difference and unity.

Book Theta sets out to define potentiality and actuality. Chapters 1–5 discuss potentiality, (Note: δύναμις, dunamis) the potential of something to change: potentiality is "a principle of change in another thing or in the thing itself qua other." (Note: 1046a9) In chapter 6 Aristotle turns to actuality. We can only know actuality through observation or "analogy;" thus "as that which builds is to that which is capable of building, so is that which is awake to that which is asleep...or that which is separated from matter to matter itself". Actuality is the completed state of something that had the potential to be completed. The relationship between actuality and potentiality can be thought of as the relationship between form and matter, but with the added aspect of time. Actuality and potentiality are distinctions that occur over time (diachronic), whereas form and matter are distinctions that can be made at fixed points in time (synchronic). Finally, chapters 7–9 discuss the interaction of potentiality and actuality with their respective object's subject/substrate. Chapter 10 is primarily about logic.

=== Books X–XIV: Iota, Kappa, Lambda, Mu, and Nu ===
- Book X or Iota: Discussion of unity, one and many, sameness and difference (contrariety), and diversity/differences within species via the lens of contrarieties.
- Book XI or Kappa: Briefer versions of other chapters and of parts of the Physics.
- Book XII or Lambda: Further remarks on beings in general, first principles, and God or gods. This book includes Aristotle's famous description of the unmoved mover, "the most divine of things observed by us", as "the thinking of thinking". Division of the very notion of substance into three parts: matter (or what's "stationary" and can be directly perceived), change (especially a positive state regarding change), and a mix of the two. This division of substance is then used to justify a "first/unmoved mover".
- Books XIII and XIV, or Mu and Nu: Philosophy of mathematics, in particular how numbers exist.

== Legacy ==
The Metaphysics is considered to be one of the greatest philosophical works. Its influence on the Greeks, the Muslim philosophers, Maimonides, the scholastic philosophers and even writers such as Dante was immense.

In the 3rd century, Alexander of Aphrodisias wrote a commentary on the first five books of the Metaphysics, and a commentary transmitted under his name exists for the final nine, but modern scholars doubt that this part was written by him. Themistius wrote an epitome of the work, of which book 12 survives in a Hebrew translation. The Neoplatonists Syrianus and Asclepius of Tralles also wrote commentaries on the work, where they attempted to synthesize Aristotle's doctrines with Neoplatonic cosmology.

Aristotle's works gained a reputation for complexity that is never more evident than with the Metaphysics — Avicenna said that he had read the Metaphysics of Aristotle forty times, but did not understand it until he also read al-Farabi's Purposes of the Metaphysics of Aristotle.

I read the Metaphysics [of Aristotle], but I could not comprehend its contents, and its author's object remained obscure to me, even when I had gone back and read it forty times and had got to the point where I had memorized it. In spite of this I could not understand it nor its object, and I despaired of myself and said, "This is a book which there is no way of understanding." But one day in the afternoon when I was at the booksellers' quarter a salesman approached with a book in his hand which he was calling out for sale. (...) So I bought it and, lo and behold, it was Abu Nasr al-Farabi's book (Note: probably the Kitab al-huruf, ed. by Muhsin Mahdi as Alfarabi's Book of Letters (Beyrouth, 1969)) on the objects of the Metaphysics. I returned home and was quick to read it, and in no time the objects of that book became clear to me because I had got to the point of having memorized it by heart.

The flourishing of Arabic Aristotelian scholarship reached its peak with the work of Ibn Rushd (Latinized: Averroes), whose extensive writings on Aristotle's work led to his later designation as "The Commentator" by future generations of scholars. Maimonides wrote the Guide to the Perplexed in the 12th century, to demonstrate the compatibility of Aristotelian science with Biblical revelation.

The Fourth Crusade (1202–1204) facilitated the discovery and delivery of many original Greek manuscripts to Western Europe. William of Moerbeke's translations of the work formed the basis of the commentaries on the Metaphysics by Albert the Great, Thomas Aquinas and Duns Scotus. They were also used by modern scholars for Greek editions, as William had access to Greek manuscripts that are now lost. Werner Jaeger lists William's translation in his edition of the Greek text in the Scriptorum Classicorum Bibliotheca Oxoniensis (Oxford 1962).

== Textual criticism ==
In the 19th century, with the rise of textual criticism, the Metaphysics was examined anew. Critics, noting the wide variety of topics and the seemingly illogical order of the books, concluded that it was actually a collection of shorter works thrown together haphazardly. In the 20th century two general editions have been produced by W. D. Ross (1924) and by Werner Jaeger (1957). Based on a careful study of the content and of the cross-references within them, Ross concluded that books A, B, Γ, E, Z, H, Θ, M, N, and I "form a more or less continuous work", while the remaining books α, Δ, Κ and Λ were inserted into their present locations by later editors. However, Ross cautions that books A, B, Γ, E, Z, H, Θ, M, N, and I — with or without the insertion of the others — do not constitute "a complete work". Jaeger further maintained that the different books were taken from different periods of Aristotle's life. Everyman's Library, for their 1000th volume, published the Metaphysics in a rearranged order that was intended to make the work easier for readers, specifically, the Everyman’s Library edition (translated by Hugh Tredennick and G. C. Armstrong) rearranges the books into a sequence intended to group thematically related discussions—placing, for example, the central ontological books (Z, H, Θ) together more coherently and repositioning others such as Δ and Λ to improve conceptual flow—rather than following the traditional Bekker order used in most scholarly editions.

Editing the Metaphysics has become an open issue in works and studies of the new millennium. New critical editions have been produced of books Gamma, Alpha, and Lambda. Differences from the more-familiar 20th Century critical editions of Ross and Jaeger mainly depend on the stemma codicum of Aristotle's Metaphysics, of which different versions have been proposed since 1970.

== Editions and translations ==
- Greek text with commentary: Aristotle's Metaphysics. W. D. Ross. 2 Vols. Oxford: Clarendon Press, 1924. Reprinted in 1953 with corrections.
- Greek text: Aristotelis Metaphysica. Ed. Werner Jaeger. Oxford Classical Texts. Oxford University Press, 1957. ISBN 978-0-19-814513-4.
- Greek text with English: Metaphysics. Trans. Hugh Tredennick. 2 vols. Loeb Classical Library 271, 287. Harvard U. Press, 1933–35. ISBN 0-674-99299-7, ISBN 0-674-99317-9.
- Aristotle's Metaphysics. Trans. Hippocrates Gorgias Apostle. Bloomington: Indiana U. Press, 1966.
- Aristotle - Metaphysics. Translated by Hope, Richard. Ann Arbor: U. Michigan P. 1960 [1952].
- Aristotle's Metaphysics. Translated by Sachs, Joe (2 ed.). Santa Fe, NM: Green Lion P. 2002. ISBN 1-888009-03-9.
- Aristotle. The Metaphysics. Penguin Classics. Translated by Lawson-Tancred, Hugh. London: Penguin. 2004 [1998]. ISBN 978-0-140-44619-7.
- Aristotle. Metaphysics. Translated by Reeve, C.D.C. Indianapolis: Hackett. 2016. ISBN 978-1624664397.

=== Ancient and medieval commentaries ===
- Commentary on Aristotle's Metaphysics (in Greek, Latin, and English). Vol. 3. Translated by Aquinas, Thomas; Rowan, John P. William of Moerbeke (1st ed.). Chicago: Henry Regnery Company (Library of Living Catholic Thought). 1961. OCLC 312731. Archived from the original on October 28, 2011 – via Dominican House of Studies in Washington, D.C. (rpt. Notre Dame, Ind.: Dumb Ox, 1995).
