= On the Heavens =

Work by Aristotle

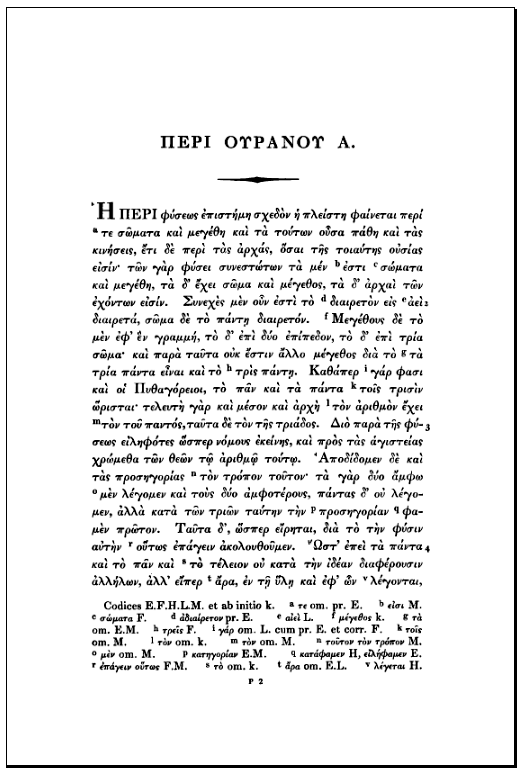
Page one of Aristotle's On the Heavens, from an edition published in 1837

On the Heavens (Greek: Περὶ οὐρανοῦ; Latin: De Caelo or De Caelo et Mundo) is Aristotle's chief cosmological treatise: written in 350 BCE, it contains his astronomical theory and his ideas on the concrete workings of the terrestrial world. It should not be confused with the spurious work On the Universe (De Mundo, also known as On the Cosmos).

This work is significant as one of the defining pillars of the Aristotelian worldview, a school of philosophy that dominated intellectual thinking for almost two millennia. Similarly, this work and others by Aristotle were important seminal works from which much of scholasticism was derived.

== Argument ==
According to Aristotle in On the Heavens, the heavenly bodies are the most perfect realities, (or "substances"), whose motions are ruled by principles other than those of bodies in the sublunary sphere. The latter are composed of one or all of the four classical elements (earth, water, air, fire) and are perishable; but the matter of which the heavens are made is imperishable aether, so they are not subject to generation and corruption. Hence their motions are eternal and perfect, and the perfect motion is the circular one, which, unlike the earthly up-and down-ward locomotions, can last eternally selfsame – an early predecessor to Newton's first law of motion. Aristotle theorized that aether did not exist anywhere on Earth, but that it was an element exclusive to the heavens. As substances, celestial bodies have matter (aether) and form (a given period of uniform rotation). Sometimes Aristotle seems to regard them as living beings with a rational soul as their form (see also Metaphysics, book XII).

Aristotle proposed a geocentric model of the universe in On the Heavens. The Earth is the center of motion of the universe, with circular motion being perfect because Earth was at the center of it. There can be only one center of the universe, and as a result there are no other inhabited worlds within it besides Earth. As such the Earth is unique and alone in this regard. Aristotle theorized that beyond the sublunary sphere and the heavens is an external spiritual space that mankind cannot fathom directly.

Aristotle also argued for the view that the following six directions exist as human-independent realities, not just relative to us: left, right, up, down, front, and back. This is an important part of his theory that the heavens move always in one direction and with no irregularities.

Much of On the Heavens is concerned with refuting the views of his predecessors. For example, Aristotle sets his eyes multiple times on the analyses of weight given by the Pythagoreans and Plato in the Timaeus.

== Historical connections ==
Aristotelian philosophy and cosmology were influential in the Islamic world, where his ideas were taken up by the Falsafa school of philosophy throughout the later half of the first millennium AD. Of these, philosophers Averroes and Avicenna are especially notable. Averroes in particular wrote extensively about On the Heavens, trying for some time to reconcile the various themes of Aristotelian philosophy, such as natural movement of the elements and the concept of planetary spheres centered on the Earth, with the mathematics of Ptolemy. These ideas would remain central to philosophical thought in the Islamic world well into the pre-modern period, and its influences can be found in both the theological and mystical tradition, including in the writings of al-Ghazali and Fakhr al-Din al-Razi.

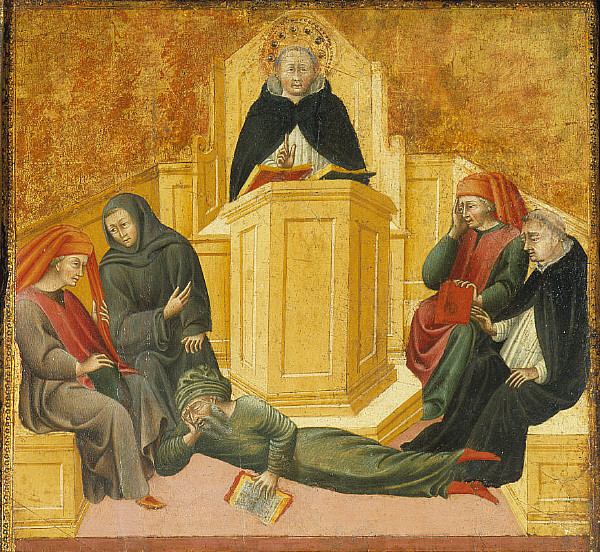
Thomas Aquinas and Averroes

European philosophers had a similarly complex relationship with On the Heavens, attempting to reconcile church doctrine with the mathematics of Ptolemy and the structure of Aristotle. A particularly cogent example of this is in the work of Thomas Aquinas, theologian, philosopher and writer of the 13th century. Thomas worked to synthesize Aristotle's cosmology as presented in On the Heavens with Christian doctrine, an endeavor that led him to reclassify Aristotle's unmoved movers as angels and attributing the 'first cause' of motion in the celestial spheres to them. Otherwise, Thomas accepted Aristotle's explanation of the physical world, including his cosmology and physics.

The 14th-century French philosopher Nicole Oresme translated and commented on On the Heavens in his role as adviser to King Charles V of France, on two occasions, once early on in life, and again near the end of it. These versions were a traditional Latin transcription and a more comprehensive French version that synthesized his views on cosmological philosophy in its entirety, Questiones Super de Celo and Livre du ciel et du monde respectively. Livre du ciel et du monde was written at the command of King Charles V, though for what purpose remains of some debate. Some speculate that, having already had Oresme translate Aristotelian works on ethics and politics in the hope of educating his courtiers, doing the same with On the Heavens may be of some value to the king.

Francis Bacon was critical of Aristotelian thought. Jürgen Klein explains that "he does not repudiate Aristotle completely", but he saw that Aristotle's cosmology and his theory of science had become obsolete, and so felt that "many of the medieval thinkers who followed his lead" were misguided.

== Translations ==
(In reverse chronological order)

- C. D. C. Reeve, De Caelo (Indianapolis: Hackett, 2020). ISBN 978-1-62466-881-4.
- Stuart Leggatt, On the Heavens: Books I & II (Oxbow Books, 1995). ISBN 978-0-85668-663-4.
- William Keith Chambers Guthrie, Aristotle On the Heavens (Cambridge, Mass.: Harvard University Press "Loeb Classical Library", 1939).
- John Leofric Stocks, On the Heavens (Oxford: Clarendon Press, 1922).
  - Adelaide Etexts
  - Sacred Texts
  - InfoMotions
  - MIT (incomplete)
  - Internet Archive (Scanned Version of Printed Text)
  - Free Audiobook (Translated by John Leofric Stocks)
- Thomas Taylor, The Treatises of Aristotle, On the Heavens, On Generation & Corruption, and On Meteors (Somerset, England: The Prometheus Trust, 2004, 1807). ISBN 1-898910-24-3.

== See also ==
- Aristotelian physics
- Celestial spheres
- Dynamics of the celestial spheres
- Physics (Aristotle)
