= On Generation and Corruption =

Work by Aristotle

On Generation and Corruption (Ancient Greek: Περὶ γενέσεως καὶ φθορᾶς; Latin: De Generatione et Corruptione), also known as On Coming to Be and Passing Away, is a treatise by Aristotle. Like many of his texts, it is both scientific, part of Aristotle's biology, and philosophic. The philosophy is essentially empirical; as in all of Aristotle's works, the inferences made about the unexperienced and unobservable are based on observations and real experiences.

== Overview ==
The question raised at the beginning of the text builds on an idea from Aristotle's earlier work The Physics. Namely, whether things come into being through causes, through some prime material, or whether everything is generated purely through "alteration."

Alteration concerned itself with the ability for elements to change based on common and uncommon qualities.

From this important work Aristotle gives us two of his most remembered contributions. First, the Four Causes and also the Four Elements (earth, wind, fire, and water). He uses these four elements to provide an explanation for the theories of other Greeks concerning atoms, an idea Aristotle considered absurd.

The work is connected with De Caelo and Meteorology, and plays a significant preparatory role to the biological and physiological texts.

Among the primary themes is an investigation of physical contraries (hot, cold, dry, and moist) and the sorts of processes and types of composition that they form in nature and biology. The theory put forward is meant to secure its position by elucidation the meaning of agent and patient, contact, process of generation, alteration, mixture, all things which his predecessors had failed to understand. It is thus, in some ways, more similar to the Physics, which is more general, clarifying the general notions of change, cause, matter, and form. It has not moved fully into an applied investigations found in the above-mentioned scientific texts.

== Generation and corruption ==
Aristotle outlined the types of change in Categories and Physics. Generation and corruption, also referred to as coming-to-be and passing-away, are opposites and differ from all other forms of change. It is not a change of place, like moving up or down, nor an alteration like warming or cooling, nor again, is it a change in size, like growing and diminishing. Instead, generation is an ultimate sort of change: changing from one substantial form to another (observed in phase changes like boiling, evaporation, burning, etc.), as water changes into air, or earth into fire.

The elements, according to Aristotle, are composed of four primary physical contraries: Heat, Cold, Dry, and Moist. Each "simple body" has two of these qualities: Fire is hot and dry; Air, hot and moist; Water, cold and moist; Earth, cold and dry. The elements of the simple bodies are these contraries in the sense that it is just the physical contraries themselves that we perceive in water or earth.

Aristotle presents a hierarchy within the primary contraries in terms of activity and receptivity. The contrary Hot and cold are more active, while moist and dry are passive qualities. In natural processes and compositions, heat and cold "act" on moisture or dryness and determine it to be in a condition. Hot and cold are again placed in opposition, so that cold is the deprivation of heat. Dryness is a deprivation of Moisture, therefore, Moisture has more formal characteristics (and drying makes earthen things crumble and disintegrate), dryness more material.

This elemental hierarchy is found again in Aristotle theory of place [τόπος], or realms, in On The Heavens. Each simple body naturally tends to move towards its proper place: fire upward, earth downward, and air and water in the middle. Not only can the elements of each realm travel into the others, they are continuously recirculated by the heat and energy of the sun.

== Mixture ==
The tenth chapter of book one deals directly with mixture. Mixtures are different than conglomerations or bundles where the parts retain independence. Mixtures, for Aristotle, consist of homogeneous parts, so that, if we divide the substance, we will always get bit of matter which are in mixture, and never ingredients in aggregation.

“Mixis has an important role to play in the analysis of homogeneous stuffs and is therefore an essential concept in Aristotle’s elementary physics and chemistry.” Frede 289

Mixture is a unique type of change or process, different from those described in the Categories:

“mixis is not easily classified as a kind of change within one of the ten categories. As we will see, it is a change that involves different substances and their properties in a complex way. It is neither the result of simple substantial change in the sense of generation proper, nor a straightforward case of alteration, nor a change in quantity, nor is it locomotion. The fact that it cannot easily be classified may indeed be one of the reasons why Aristotle usually leaves it out of his standard list of change.” Frede 290

“Aristotle first of all shows that mixture must be a process sui generis and not identical with generation and corruption, nor with any of the other kinds of change that he had described in the previous chapters (327b6–22).” Frede 291

Aristotle theory of mixture is an important to understand because it describes something utterly inconceivable to Atomists. For Atomism, the composition of any complex body will only ever amount to a conglomeration of atoms. It is impossible for the atoms to fuse so intimately that they become something entirely new when mixed.

Aristotle examines and rejects several objections:

“(a) the ingredients of the mixture remain intact, in which case there is no mixture at all because nothing actually happens to its components; or (b) one of the ingredients perishes, in which case there will also be no mixture, because it no longer contains both ingredients; or (c) if on coming together both ingredients perish, there will once again be no mixture because there cannot be a mixture that is not of its mixables.” Frede 191

He presents his own position in two parts:

First, he attempts to solve the problems in a formal way, by reference to his theory of activity and potency.

"Since, however, some things have a potential, and other things an actual, existence, it is possible for things which combine in a mixture to 'be' in one sense and 'not-be' in another, the resulting compound formed from them being actually something different [from the ingredients] but each ingredient being still potentially what it was before they were mixed and not destroyed." (327b22-27)

He goes on to say that the potency is preserved in the mixture, even if they are not in actuality. Before explaining this further, Aristotle considers one last objection that he rejects: that mixture is an illusion of sense perception.

Second, he closes the chapter by providing further elaborating this theory. He says that the parts must share a common material. Having the same material means the parts can form reciprocal relations of actions and passions. Nothing can be acted on unless it has the matter that is capable of being acted on in that way. So the ingredients must have this common qualities if they are to mix. Second, they must have the appropriate proportions of potency: if one ingredient overpowers another a mixture will not be produced, instead a destruction of one will occur.

“Only if the ingredients are somehow equal in power can there be mixture. In that case there is change in both constituents, but neither will turn into the other. Instead, the mutual change will result in a dominant state (kratoun) that is ‘in between and common’ (metaxu kai koinon) to both.” Frede 195

This dominant state is neither of the ingredients nor their aggregation, it is a new form which is sui generis. The ingredients, get something new from each other that they did not have before and achieve a state that is between them [μεταξύ]. This novel form unlocks new possibilities and exhibits new properties, not found in the ingredients in isolation. Thus milk, wine, and vinegar are all mixtures of the same elements while having vastly different physical qualities. Furthermore, the mixture will also put some of the activities of its ingredients in check. Fire burns earthy bodies, but when mixed in flesh both constituents coexist without the flesh thereby burning itself. The elements can escape from composition by disintegration.

== Medieval editions ==
The 10th-century Al-Fihrist by the Arab author al-Nadim lists an abridgement of De Generatione et Corruptione by the Shi'a theologian philosopher Abu Muhammad al-Hasan ibn Musa al-Nawbakhti.

== Contemporary editions ==
The most recent and authoritative Greek text is the Budé edition by Marwan Rashed, Aristote. De la géneration et la corruption. Nouvelle édition. Paris: Les Belles Lettres, 2005. ISBN 2-251-00527-7. This edition includes a French translation, notes and appendices, and a lengthy introduction exploring the treatise's contents and the history of the text.
