= Ancient Commentators on Aristotle project =

The Ancient Commentators on Aristotle project based at King's College London and under the direction of Richard Sorabji has undertaken to translate into English the ancient commentaries on Aristotle. The project began in 1987 and in 2012 published its 100th volume. A further 30 or so volumes are planned. The project is now co-edited by Michael Griffin (UBC).

Name	Work	Translator(s)	Year of release
Philoponus	Against Aristotle on the eternity of the world	C. Wildberg	1987
Alexander of Aphrodisias	On Aristotle Metaphysics 1	W. E. Dooley	1989
Simplicius	On Aristotle Physics 6	D. Konstan	1989
Alexander of Aphrodisias	Ethical Problems	R. W. Sharples	1990
Dexippus	On Aristotle Categories	J. Dillon	1990
Philoponus; Simplicius	Corollaries on Place and Void; Against Philoponus On the Eternity of the World	D. Furley; C. Wildberg	1991
Ammonius	On Aristotle Categories	G. B. Matthews; S. M. Cohen	1991
Philoponus	On Aristotle On the Intellect	W. Charlton; F. Bossier	1991
Alexander of Aphrodisias	On Aristotle Prior Analytics 1.1-7	J. Barnes; S. Bobzien; K. Flannery; K. Ierodiakonou	1991
Alexander of Aphrodisias	On Aristotle Metaphysics 2-3	W. E. Dooley; A. Madigan	1992
Simplicius	Corollaries on Place and Time	J. O. Urmson; L. Siorvanes	1992
Alexander of Aphrodisias	Quaestiones 1.1-2.15	R. W. Sharples	1992
Porphyry	On Aristotle Categories	S. Strange	1992
Simplicius	On Aristotle Physics 4.1-5 and 10-14	J. O. Urmson	1992
Alexander of Aphrodisias	On Aristotle Metaphysics 5	W. Dooley	1993
Alexander of Aphrodisias	On Aristotle Metaphysics 4	A. Madigan	1993
Philoponus	On Aristotle Physics 2	A. R. Lacey	1993
Philoponus; Simplicius	On Aristotle Physics 5-8; On Aristotle on the Void	P. Lettinck; J. O. Urmson	1994
Simplicius	On Aristotle Physics 7	C. Hagen	1994
Philoponus	On Aristotle Physics 3	M. Edwards	1994
Alexander of Aphrodisias	Quaestiones 2.16-3.15	R. W. Sharples	1994
Simplicius	On Aristotle On the Soul 1.1-2.4	J. O. Urmson; P. Lautner	1995
Ammonius	On Aristotle On Interpretation 1-8	D. Blank	1996
Alexander of Aphrodisias	On Aristotle Meteorology 4	E. Lewis	1996
Themistius	On Aristotle on the Soul	R. B. Todd	1996
Simplicius	On Aristotle Physics 2	B. Fleet	1997
Simplicius	On Aristotle Physics 5	J. O. Urmson	1997
Simplicius; Priscian	On Aristotle On the Soul 2.5-12; On Theophrastus on Sense Perception	C. Steel; P. Huby	1997
Ammonius; Boethius	On Aristotle On Interpretation 9	D. Blank; N. Kretzmann	1998
Alexander of Aphrodisias	On Aristotle Prior Analytics 1.8-13	I. Mueller; J. Gould	1999
Alexander of Aphrodisias	On Aristotle Prior Analytics 1.14-22	I. Mueller; J. Gould	1999
Philoponus	On Aristotle On Coming-to-Be and Perishing 1.1-5	C. J. F. Williams	1999
Philoponus	On Aristotle On Coming-to-Be and Perishing 1.6-2.4	C. J. F. Williams	2000
Philoponus	On Aristotle On the Soul 3.1-8	W. Charlton	2000
Philoponus; Stephanus	On Aristotle On the Soul 3.9-13; On Aristotle On Interpretation	W. Charlton	2000
Simplicius	On Aristotle On the Soul 3.1-5	H. Blumenthal	2000
Porphyry	On Abstinence from Killing Animals	G. Clark	2000
Alexander of Aphrodisias	On Aristotle On Sense Perception	A. Towey	2000
Simplicius	On Aristotle Categories 9-15	R. Gaskin	2000
Alexander of Aphrodisias	On Aristotle Topics 1	J. M. Van Ophuijsen	2000
Simplicius	On Aristotle Categories 5-6	F. de Haas; B. Fleet	2001
Simplicius	On Aristotle Physics 8.6-10	R. McKirahan	2001
Aspasius; Michael of Ephesus; Anonymous	On Aristotle Nicomachean Ethics 8-9	D. Konstan	2001
Simplicius	On Aristotle Physics 3	J. O. Urmson; P. Lautner	2001
Simplicius	On Epictetus Handbook 1-26	C. Brittain; T. Brennan	2002
Simplicius	On Epictetus Handbook 27-53	T. Brennan; C. Brittain	2002
Simplicius	On Aristotle On the Heavens 1.1-4	R. J. Hankinson	2002
Simplicius	On Aristotle Categories 7-8	B. Fleet	2002
Proclus	On the Existence of Evils	J. Opsomer; C. Steel	2003
Themistius	On Aristotle Physics 4	R. B. Todd	2003
Simplicius	On Aristotle Categories 1-4	M. Chase	2003
Alexander of Aphrodisias	Supplement to On the Soul	R. W. Sharples	2004
Simplicius	On Aristotle On the Heavens 1.5-9	R. J. Hankinson	2004
Simplicius	On Aristotle On the Heavens 2.1-9	I. Mueller	2004
Simplicius	On Aristotle On the Heavens 2.10-14	I. Mueller	2005
Philoponus	On Aristotle On the Soul 2.1-6	W. Charlton	2005
Philoponus	On Aristotle On the Soul 2.7-12	W. Charlton	2005
Philoponus	Against Proclus on the Eternity of the World 1-5	M. Share	2005
Philoponus	Against Proclus on the Eternity of the World 6-8	M. Share	2005
Philoponus	On Aristotle On Coming-to-Be and Perishing 2.5-11	I. Kupreeva	2005
Philoponus	On Aristotle On the Soul 1.1-2	P. van der Eijk	2005
Alexander of Aphrodisias	On Aristotle On Coming-to-Be and Perishing 2.2-5	E. Gannagé	2005
Philoponus	On Aristotle Physics 1.1-3	C. Osborne	2006
Alexander of Aphrodisias	On Aristotle Prior Analytics 1.23-31	I. Mueller	2006
Alexander of Aphrodisias	On Aristotle Prior Analytics 1.32-46	I. Mueller	2006
Simplicius	On Aristotle On the Heavens 1.10-12	R. J. Hankinson	2006
Philoponus	On Aristotle On the Soul 1.3-5	P. van der Eijk	2006
Philoponus	Against Proclus on the Eternity of the World 12-18	J. Wilberding	2006
Aspasius	On Aristotle Nicomachean Ethics 1-4, 7-8	D. Konstan	2006
Syrianus	On Aristotle Metaphysics 13-14	J. Dillon; D. O’Meara	2006
Proclus	On Providence	C. Steel	2007
Proclus	On Plato Cratylus	B. Duvick	2007
Philoponus	On Aristotle Posterior Analytics 1.1-8	R. McKirahan	2008
Syrianus	On Aristotle Metaphysics 3-4	D. O’Meara; J. Dillon	2008
Themistius	On Aristotle Physics 5-8	R. B. Todd	2008
Philoponus	On Aristotle Physics 1.4-9	C. Osborne	2008
Philoponus	On Aristotle Posterior Analytics 2	O. Goldin	2008
Simplicius	On Aristotle On the Heavens 3.1-7	I. Mueller	2009
Simplicius	On Aristotle On the Heavens 3.7-4.6	I. Mueller	2009
Philoponus	Against Proclus on the Eternity of the World 9-11	M. Share	2010
Boethius	On Aristotle On Interpretation 1-3	A. Smith	2010
Boethius	On Aristotle On Interpretation 4-6	A. Smith	2011
Porphyry	To Gaurus on How Embryos are Ensouled and On What is in Our Power	J. Wilberding	2011
Philoponus	On Aristotle Meteorology 1.4-9, 12	I. Kupreeva; R. Sorabji	2011
Simplicius	On Aristotle Physics 1.5-9	H. Baltussen	2011
Simplicius	On Aristotle on Physics 1.3-4	P. Huby; C. C. W. Taylor	2011
Alexander of Aphrodisias	On Aristotle on the Soul	V. Caston	2011
Simplicius	On Aristotle On the Heavens 1.3-4	I. Mueller	2011
Themistius	On Aristotle on Physics 1-3	R. B. Todd	2011
Philoponus	On Aristotle Physics 4.10-14	S. Broadie	2011
Proclus	Ten Questions on Providence	J. Opsomer; C. Steel	2011
Philoponus	On Aristotle Posterior Analytics 1.9-18	R. D. McKirahan	2011

== See also ==
- Commentaria in Aristotelem Graeca
