= Commentaries on Aristotle =

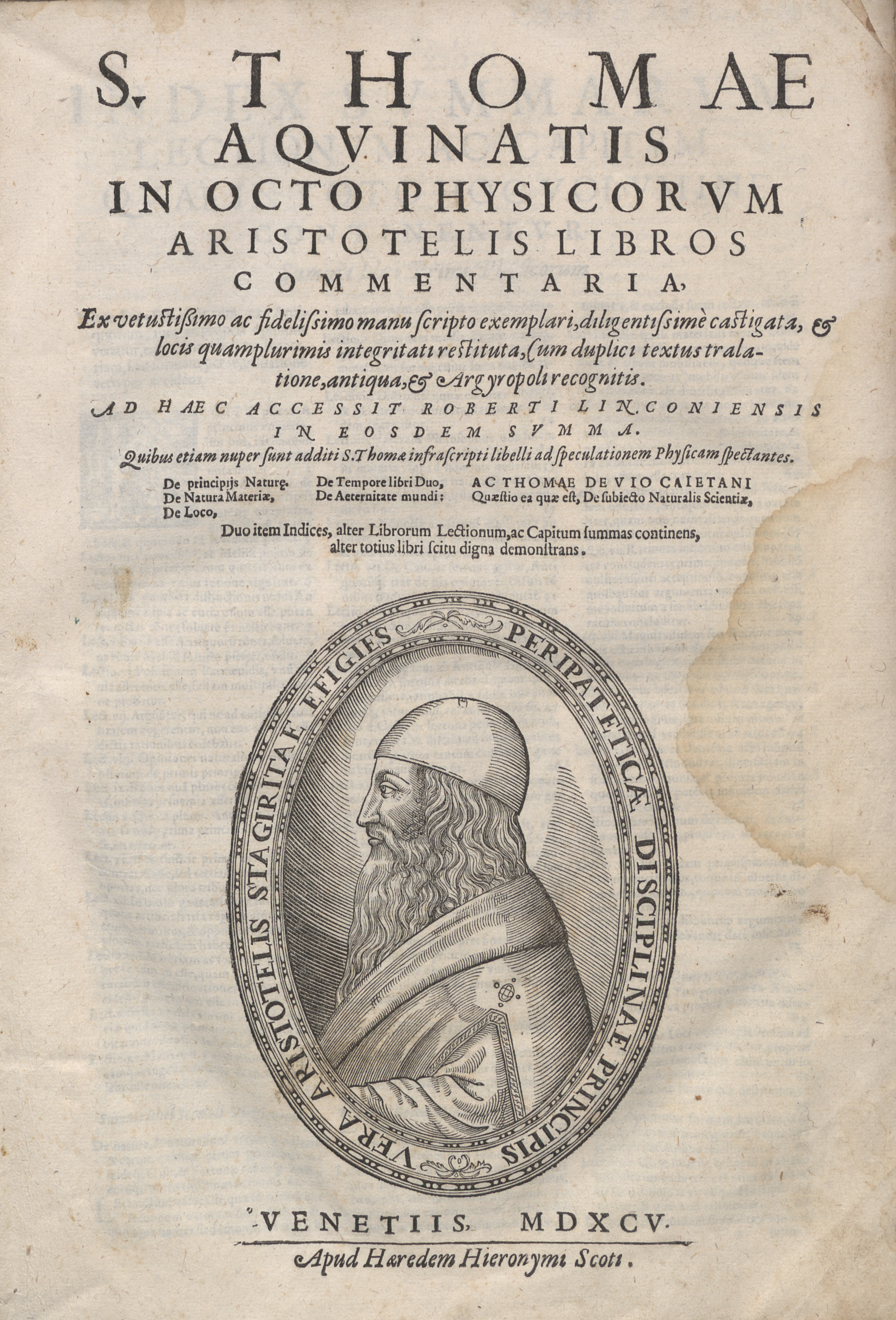
A 1595 edition of Thomas Aquinas' commentaries on Aristotle. The page depicts Aristotle himself.

A great mass of literature has been produced to explain and clarify the works of Aristotle, especially during the ancient and medieval eras. The pupils of Aristotle (384‍–‍322 BC) were the first to comment on his writings, a tradition which was continued by the Peripatetic school throughout the Hellenistic and Roman periods. The Neoplatonists of the Later Roman Empire wrote many commentaries on Aristotle, attempting to incorporate him into their philosophy. Although Ancient Greek commentaries are considered the most useful, commentaries continued to be written by the Christian scholars of the Byzantine Empire and by the many Islamic philosophers and Western scholastics who had inherited his texts.

== Greek commentators ==
The first pupils of Aristotle commentated on his writings, but often with a view to expand his work. Thus Theophrastus invented five moods of syllogism in the first figure, in addition to the four invented by Aristotle, and stated with additional accuracy the rules of hypothetical syllogisms. He also often differed with his master, including in collecting much information concerning animals and natural events, which Aristotle had omitted.

During the early Roman Empire we find few celebrated names among the Peripatetic philosophers. Nicolaus of Damascus wrote several treatises on the philosophy of Aristotle; and Alexander of Aegae also wrote commentaries on Aristotle. The earliest commentaries which survive, are those written in the 2nd century by Adrastus and Aspasius. Alexander of Aphrodisias (c. 200) was regarded by subsequent Aristotelians among the Greeks, Latins, and Muslims, as the best interpreter of Aristotle. On account of the number and value of his commentaries, he was called, by way of distinction, "The Commentator". Several of his works are still extant, among which is a treatise On Fate, wherein he supports the doctrine of divine providence.

Many of the Neoplatonists undertook to explain and illustrate the writings of Aristotle, particularly on the subject of dialectics, which Plato had left imperfect. Porphyry (3rd century) wrote a book on the Categories, which was found to be so suitable a complement to the Categories of Aristotle, that it was usually prefixed to that treatise. Porphyry sought to show that Plato and Aristotle were in harmony with each other, especially in regards to the compatibility of Aristotle's Categories with Plato's Theory of Forms. Porphyry's pupil Iamblichus continued this process of harmonising Plato and Aristotle, and Dexippus, a disciple of Iamblichus, wrote a Reply to the Objections of Plotinus against Aristotle's Categories, which is still extant. Themistius (4th century), who taught at Constantinople with great success, paraphrased several of the works of Aristotle, particularly the Posterior Analytics, the Physics, and the book On the Soul. In the 5th century, Ammonius Hermiae represented Plato and Aristotle in agreeing that god was the artificier of a beginningless universe. Olympiodorus, an Alexandrian philosopher, wrote commentaries upon Aristotle's Meteorology and Categories. Simplicius of Cilicia (6th century) wrote extensive commentaries upon Aristotle, and, like many of the other Neoplatonists, attempted to reconcile the doctrines of the Pythagoreans, of the Eleatics, of Plato, and of the Stoics, with those of Aristotle. He also strenuously defended Aristotle's doctrine concerning the eternity of the world.

In the 6th century, Boethius entertained the design of translating into Latin the whole of Aristotle's and Plato's works and of showing their agreement—a gigantic plan, which he never executed. Alongside the Categoriae Decem misattributed to St Augustine, his Latin translations and commentaries on Aristotle's Categories and On Interpretation and Porphyry's Isagoge became the logica vetus ("old logic") through which Aristotle was almost exclusively known in Western Europe until the 1130s. Boethius's near contemporary John Philoponus, however, maintained that Aristotle had been entirely misunderstood by Porphyry and Proclus's incorporation of his terms into Neoplatonism and by projects like Boethius's that sought to reconcile Aristotle with Plato's theory of forms; John instead offered a Christian interpretation of the Aristotelian corpus. Others, again, wrote epitomes, compounds, abstracts; and tried to throw the works of Aristotle into some simpler and more obviously regular form, as John of Damascus, in the middle of the 8th century, who made abstracts of some of Aristotle's works, and introduced the study of the author into theological education. John of Damascus lived under the patronage of the Arabs, and was at first secretary to the Caliph, but afterwards withdrew to a monastery.

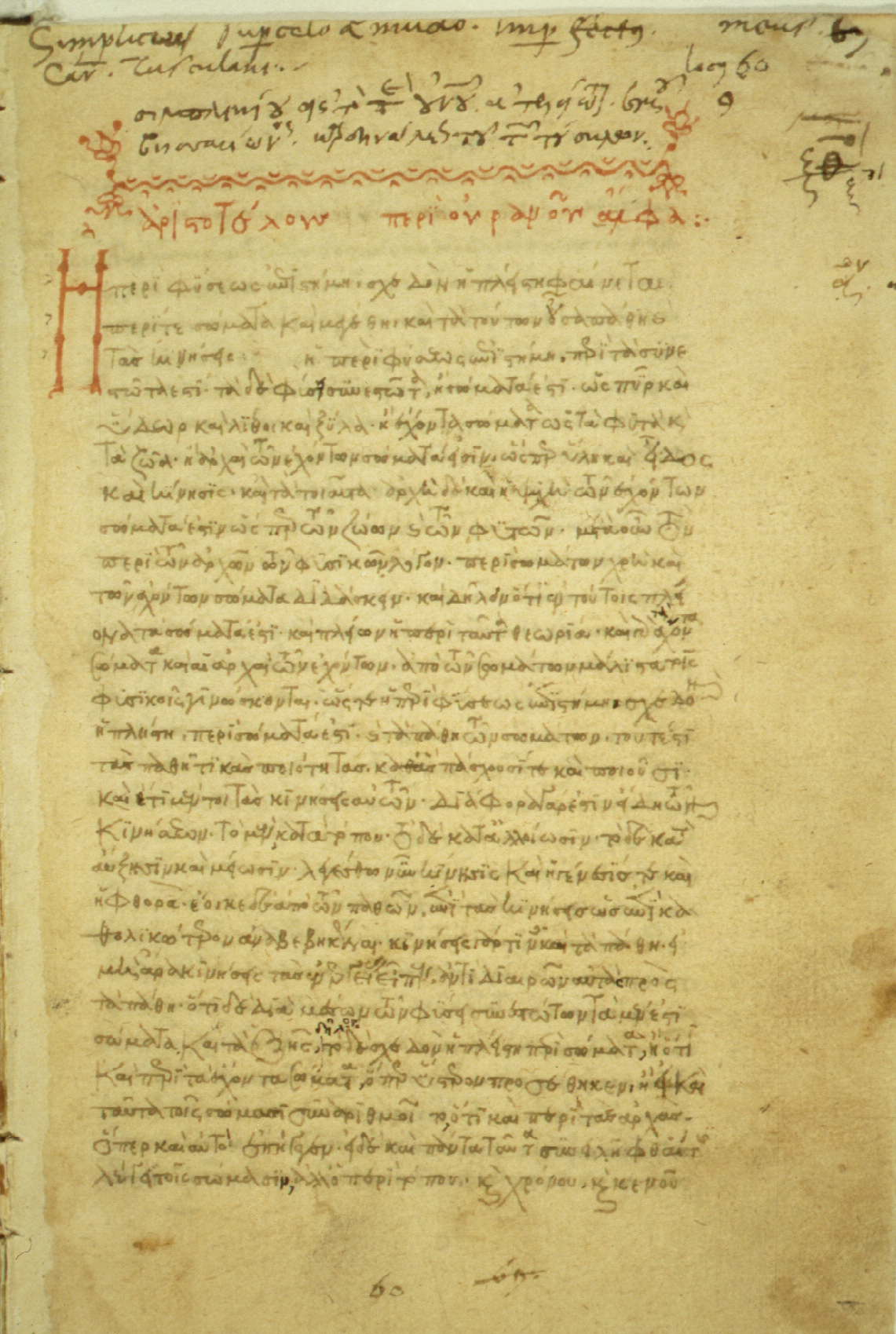
Simplicius's commentary on Aristotle's On the Heavens, 14th century manuscript signed by owner, Bessarion.

The line of the Aristotelian commentators was continued to the later ages of the Byzantine Empire. In the 12th century Anna Comnena organised a group of scholars which included the commentators Michael of Ephesus, and Eustratius of Nicaea who employed himself upon the dialectic and moral treatises, and whom she does not hesitate to elevate above the Stoics and Platonists for his talent in philosophical discussions. Nicephorus Blemmydes wrote logical and physical epitomes for the use of John III Doukas Vatatzes; George Pachymeres composed an epitome of the philosophy of Aristotle, and a compendium of his logic: Theodore Metochites, who was famous in his time for his eloquence and his learning, has left a paraphrase of the books of Aristotle on Physics, On the Soul, On the Heavens, etc. The same period saw the commentaries and paraphrases of Sophonias. In the post-Byzantine period, one of the most important Aristotelian commentators is Theophilos Corydalleus.

One Byzantine-era commentator, Allīnūs, is known only from citations and excerpts in Arabic sources.

== Islamic commentators ==
In the 9th century, the Platonising school of Thābit ibn Qurra in Baghdad translated Aristotle and his commentators into Arabic. Islamic scholars made a point of studying the writings of Aristotle, especially his metaphysical and logical writings, and also of his Physics. They wrote commentaries on Aristotle, and developed still further the abstract logical element. Many of these commentaries are still extant.

Al-Kindi, who wrote a commentary on Aristotelian logic, lived in the 9th century, under Al-Ma'mun. Al-Farabi (10th century) wrote commentaries on Aristotle's Organon, which were made diligent use of by the Scholastics. It is related of him that he read through Aristotle's treatise On Hearing forty times, and his Rhetoric two hundred times, without getting at all tired of them. The physicians made a study of philosophy, and formulated theories; among them was Avicenna (c. 980-1037), who came from Bukhara, to the east of the Caspian Sea; he wrote a commentary on Aristotle. Al-Ghazali (1058–1111) wrote compendiums of logic and metaphysics. Averroes (1126–1198), sometimes referred to simply as 'The Commentator', was especially distinguished as a commentator of Aristotle. He often wrote two or three different commentaries on the same work, and some 38 commentaries by Averroes on the works of Aristotle have been identified. Although his writings had only marginal impact in Islamic countries, his works had a huge impact in the Latin West following the Latin translations of the 12th and 13th centuries.

== Commentators in the Latin West ==
Scholastic philosophy in the Latin West was decisively shaped when the works of Aristotle became widely available, at first through translations of commentators and their basis texts from Arabic, and later through translations from Greek of Aristotle's original text (notably by William of Moerbeke) and of the Greek commentators. Albertus Magnus, Thomas Aquinas, Duns Scotus, and William of Ockham, among many others, wrote important philosophical works in the form of Aristotelian commentaries. On this basis, 14th -century scholar Nicole Oresme translated Aristotle's moral works into French and wrote extensive comments on them.

=== Lists and indices of commentaries ===
A list of Medieval and Renaissance commentaries on all of Aristotle's works has been compiled by Charles H. Lohr:

- 1967: “Medieval Aristotle Commentaries: Authors A-F”, Traditio, 23, 313-413.
- 1968: “Medieval Aristotle Commentaries: Authors G-I”, Traditio, 24, 149-245.
- 1970: "Medieval Aristotle Commentaries: Authors Jacobus-Johannes Juff", Traditio, 26, 135-216.
- 1971: "Medieval Aristotle Commentaries: Authors Johannes de Kanthi–Myngodus", Traditio, 27, 251-351.
- 1972: "Medieval Aristotle Commentaries: Authors Narcissus–Richardus", Traditio, 28, 281-396.
- 1973: "Medieval Aristotle Commentaries: Authors Robertus–Wilgelmus", Traditio, 29, 93-197.
- 1974: "Medieval Aristotle Commentaries: Supplementary Authors ", Traditio, 30, 119-144.
- 1974: "Renaissance Latin Aristotle Commentaries: Authors A-B", Studies in the Renaissance, 21, 228-289.
- 1975: "Renaissance Latin Aristotle Commentaries: Authors C", Renaissance Quarterly, 28, 689-741.
- 1976: "Renaissance Latin Aristotle Commentaries: Authors D-F", Renaissance Quarterly, 29, 714-745.
- 1977: "Renaissance Latin Aristotle Commentaries: Authors G-K", Renaissance Quarterly, 30, 681-741.
- 1978: "Renaissance Latin Aristotle Commentaries: Authors L-M", Renaissance Quarterly, 31, 532-603.
- 1979: "Renaissance Latin Aristotle Commentaries: Authors N-Ph", Renaissance Quarterly, 32, 529-580.
- 1980: "Renaissance Latin Aristotle Commentaries: Authors Pi-Sm", Renaissance Quarterly, 33, 623-734.
- 1982: "Renaissance Latin Aristotle Commentaries: Authors So-Z", Renaissance Quarterly, 35, 164-256.

The articles are reprinted in the following volumes by Charles H. Lohr:

- Latin Aristotle Commentaries. I.1. Medieval Authors. A-L (Corpus Philosophorum Medii Aevi. Subsidia, 17), Firenze: Sismel Edizioni del Galluzzo, 2013.
- Latin Aristotle Commentaries. I.2. Medieval Authors. M-Z (Corpus Philosophorum Medii Aevi. Subsidia, 18), Firenze: Sismel Edizioni del Galluzzo, 2010.
- Latin Aristotle Commentaries. II. Renaissance Authors (Corpus Philosophorum Medii Aevi. Subsidia, 6), Firenze: Leo S. Olschki, 1988.
- Latin Aristotle Commentaries. III. Index initiorum - Index finium (Corpus Philosophorum Medii Aevi. Subsidia, 10), Firenze: Leo S. Olschki, 1988.
- Latin Aristotle Commentaries. V. Bibliography of Secondary Literature (Corpus Philosophorum Medii Aevi. Subsidia, 15), Firenze: Sismel Edizioni del Galluzzo, 2005.

== See also ==
- Ancient commentators project
- Aristotelianism
- Commentaria in Aristotelem Graeca
- Commentaries on Plato
- Conimbricenses
- List of Renaissance commentators on Aristotle

== Sources ==
- Johann Jakob Brucker, (1837), The History of Philosophy, from the Earliest Periods, pages 349-53
- Edward Grant, (1996), The Foundations of Modern Science in the Middle Ages: Their Religious Institutional and Intellectual Contexts, page 30. Cambridge University Press
- Georg Wilhelm Friedrich Hegel, (1896), Lectures on the History of Philosophy, Part Two. Philosophy of the Middle Ages, pages 34–35
- Franz Rosenthal (1972), "A Commentator of Aristotle", in S. M. Stern; Albert Hourani; Vivian Brown (eds.), Islamic Philosophy and the Classical Tradition: Essays Presented by His Friends and Pupils to Richard Walzer on His Seventieth Birthday, University of South Carolina Press, pp. 337–349.
- Richard Sorabji, "Aristotle Commentators" entry in Routledge Encyclopedia of Philosophy (1998)
- Richard Walzer (1962), "New Light on the Arabic Translations of Aristotle", Greek into Arabic; Essays on Islamic Philosophy, Harvard University Press, pp. 60–113.
- William Whewell, (1837), History of the Inductive Sciences: From the Earliest to the Present Times, pages 271-5
