= Commentaria in Aristotelem Graeca =

Standard collection of extant ancient Greek commentaries on Aristotle

Commentaria in Aristotelem Graeca [edita consilio et auctoritate academiae litterarum Regiae Borussicae] (CAG) (Greek Commentaries on Aristotle [edited by order and authority of the Prussian Royal Academy of literary studies]) is the standard collection of extant ancient Greek commentaries on Aristotle. The 23 volumes in the series were released between the years 1882 and 1909 by the publisher Reimer. Many of these commentaries have since been translated into English by the Ancient commentators project.

Volume	Commentator	Work	Released
I.	Alexander Aphrodisiensis	In Aristotelis metaphysica commentaria, ed. Michael Hayduck	1891
II.1.	Alexander Aphrodisiensis	In Aristotelis analyticorum priorum librum 1 commentarium, ed. Maximilianus Wallies	1883
II.2.	Alexander Aphrodisiensis	In Aristotelis topicorum libros octo commentaria, ed. Maximilianus Wallies	1891
II.3.	Alexandri quod fertur (Michael Ephesius)	In Aristotelis sophisticos elenchos commentarium, Maximilianus Wallies	1898
III.1.	Alexander Aphrodisiensis	In librum de sensu commentarium, ed. Paulus Wendland	1901
III.2.	Alexander Aphrodisiensis	In Aristotelis meteorologicorum libros commentarium, ed. Michael Hayduck	1899
IV.1.	Porphyrius	Isagoge et in Aristotelis categorias, ed. Adolfus Busse	1887
IV.2.	Dexippus	In Aristotelis categorias commentaria, ed. Adolfus Busse	1888
IV.3.	Ammonius	In Porphyrii isagogen sive V voces, ed. Adolfus Busse	1891
IV.4.	Ammonius	In Aristotelis categorias commentarius, ed. Adolfus Busse	1895
IV.5.	Ammonius	In Aristotelis de interpretatione commentarius, ed. Adolfus Busse	1897
IV.6.	Ammonius	In Aristotelis analyticorum priorum librum 1 commentarium, ed. Maximilianus Wallies	1899
V.1.	Themistius	analyticorum posteriorium paraphrasis, ed. Maximilianus Wallies	1900
V.2.	Themistius	In Aristotelis physica paraphrasis, ed. Henricus Schenkl	1900
V.3.	Themistius	In libros Aristotelis de anima paraphrasis, ed. Ricardus Heinze	1899
V.4.	Themistius	In libros Aristotelis de caelo paraphrasis hebraice et latine, ed. Samuel Landauer	1902
V.5.	Themistius	in Aristotelis metaphysicorum librum Λ(12) paraphrasis hebraice et latine, ed. Samuel Landauer	1903
V.6.	Pseudo-Themistius	in parva naturalia commentarium, ed. Paulus Wendland	1903
VI.1.	Syrianus	in Metaphysica (Β - Γ (3 - 4), Μ - Ν (13 - 14)) commentaria, ed. Guilelmus Kroll	1902
VI.2.	Asclepius	in Aristotelis metaphysicorum libros Α - Ζ (1 - 7) commentaria, ed. Michael Hayduck	1888
VII.	Simplicius	in Aristotelis de caelo commentaria, ed. I.(Johan) L.(Ludvig) Heiberg	1894
VIII.	Simplicius	in Aristotelis Categorias commentarium, ed. Carolus Kalbfleisch	1907
IX.	Simplicius	in Aristotelis physicorum libros quattuor priores (1 - 4) commentaria, ed. Hermannus Diels	1882
X.	Simplicius	in Aristotelis physicorum libros quattuor posteriores (5 - 8) commentaria, Hermannus Diels	1895
XI.	Simplicius	in libros Aristotelis de anima commentaria, ed. Michael Hayduck	1882
XII.1.	Olympiodorus	prolegomena et in categorias, ed. Adolfus Busse	1902
XII.2.	Olympiodorus	in Aristotelis meteora commentaria, ed. Guilelmus Stüve	1900
XIII.1.	Philoponus (olim Ammonii)	in Aristotelis categorias commentarium, ed. Adolfus Busse	1898
XIII.2.	Ioannis Philoponi	in Aristotelis analytica priora commentaria, ed. Maximilianus Wallies	1905
XIII.3.	Ioannis Philoponi	in Aristotelis analytica posteriora commentaria cum Anonymo in librum II, ed. Maximilianus Wallies	1909
XIV.1.	Ioannis Philoponi	in Aristotelis meteorologicorum librum primum commentarium, ed. Michael Hayduck	1901
XIV.2.	Ioannis Philoponi	in Aristotelis libros de generatione et corruptione commentaria, ed. Hieronymus Vitelli	1897
XIV.3.	Ioannis Philoponi (Michaelis Ephesii)	in libros de generatione animalium commentaria, ed. Michael Hayduck	1903
XV.	Ioannis Philoponi	in Aristotelis de anima libros commentaria, ed. Michael Hayduck	1897
XVI.	Ioannis Philoponi	in Aristotelis physicorum libros tres priores commentaria, ed. Hieronymus Vitelli	1887
XVII.	Ioannis Philoponi	in Aristotelis physicorum libros quinque posteriores (4 - 8) commentaria, ed. Hieronymus Vitelli	1888
XVIII.1.	Eliae	in Porphyrii Isagogen et Aristotelis categorias commentaria, ed. Adolfus Busse	1900
XVIII.2.	Davidis	prolegomena et in Porphyrii Isagogen commentarium, ed. Adolfus Busse	1904
XVIII.3.	Stephani	in librum Aristotelis de interpretatione commentarium, ed. Michael Hayduck	1885
XIX.1.	Aspasii	in ethica Nicomachea quae supersunt commentaria, ed. Gustavus Heylbut	1889
XIX.2.	Heliodori	in ethica Nicomachea paraphrasis, ed. Gustavus Heylbut	1889
XX.	Eustratii et Michaelis et Anonyma	in ethica Nicomachea commentaria, ed. Gustavus Heylbut	1892
XXI.1.	Eustratii	in analyticorum posteriorum librum secundum commentarium, ed. Michael Hayduck	1907
XXI.2.	Anonymi et Stephani	in artem rhetoricam commentaria, ed. Huge Rabe	1896
XXII.1.	Michaelis Ephesii	in parva naturalia commentaria, ed. Paulus Wendland	1903
XXII.2.	Michaelis Ephesii	in libros de partibus animalium, de animalium motione, de animalium incessu commentaria, ed. Michael Hayduck	1904
XXII.3.	Michaelis Ephesii	in librum quintum ethicorum Nicomacheorum commentarium, ed. Michael Hayduck	1901
XXIII.1.	Sophoniae	in libros de anima paraphrasis, ed. Michael Hayduck	1883
XXIII.2.	Anonymi	categoriarum paraphrasis, ed. Michael Hayduck	1883
XXIII.3.	Themistii	quae fertur in Aristotelis analyticorum priorum librum I paraphrasis, ed. Maximilianus Wallies	1884
XXIII.4.	Anonymi	in sophisticos elenchos paraphrasis, ed. Maximilianus Wallies	1884
