= University =

Academic and research institution

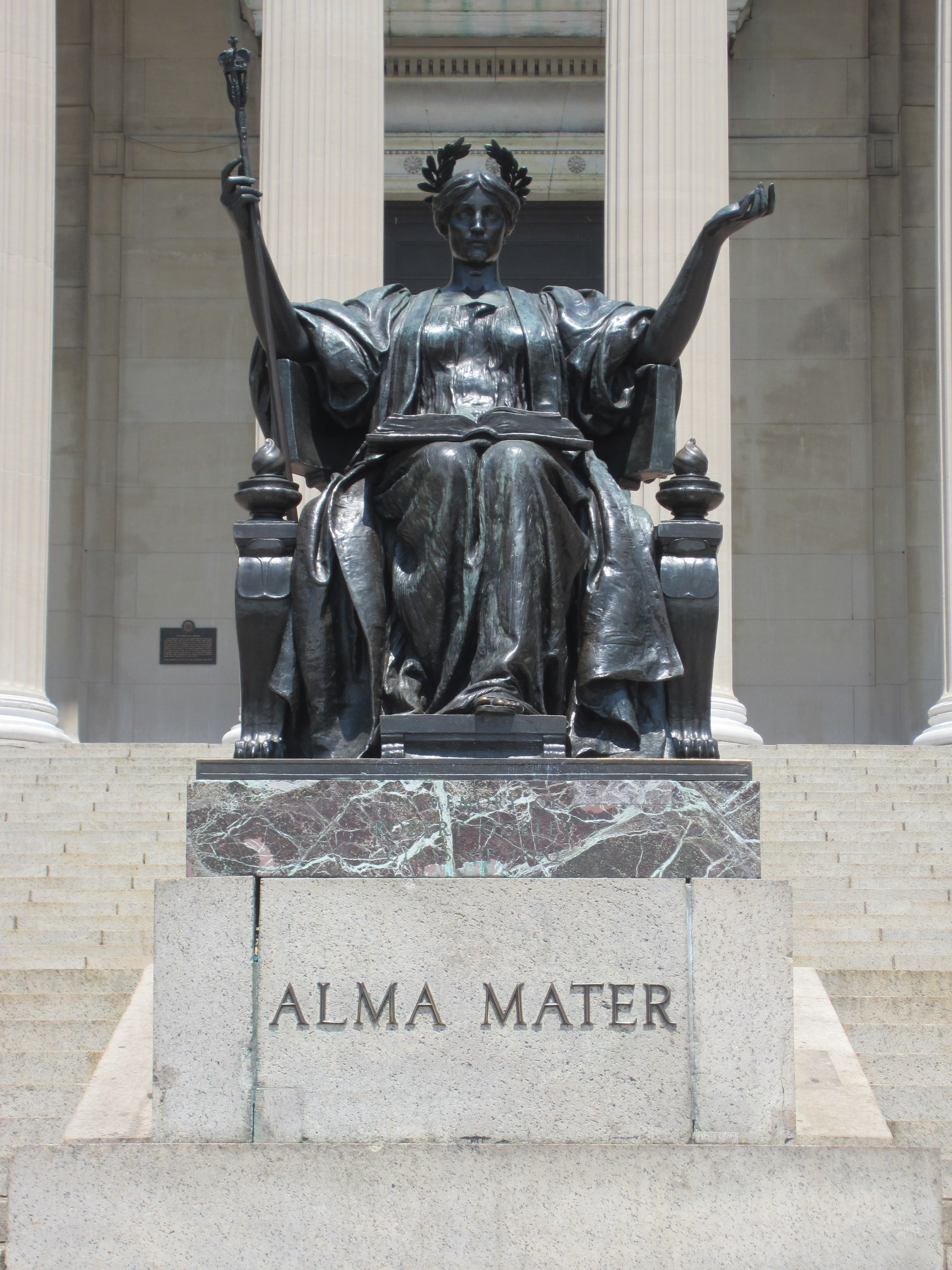
Alma Mater by Daniel Chester French, Columbia University. The alma mater, meaning "nourishing mother" in Latin, is one of the most enduring symbols of the university. The phrase is associated with the University of Bologna, Italy, founded in 1088.

A university (from Latin universitas 'a whole') is an institution of tertiary education and research which awards academic degrees in several academic disciplines. University is derived from the Latin phrase universitas magistrorum et scholarium, which roughly means "community of teachers and scholars". Universities typically offer both undergraduate and postgraduate programs.

The first universities were developed in Europe from schools that had been maintained by the Church for the purpose of educating priests.

The following properties were common among the oldest universities:

1. They used the word universitas (which was coined at its foundation).
2. They received students from everywhere (not merely the local district or region).
3. They engaged in higher learning that went beyond teaching the Seven Liberal Arts, and had at least one of the higher faculties (Theology, Law or Medicine).
4. They awarded degrees through an oral and public event managed by a guild of masters.
5. They had some degree of autonomy from ecclesiastical authorities.
6. They enjoyed academic freedom.
7. They issued secular as well as non-secular degrees.

The oldest universities with the former criteria were University of Bologna, University of Paris, University of Oxford, University of Cambridge and University of Palencia.

== History ==
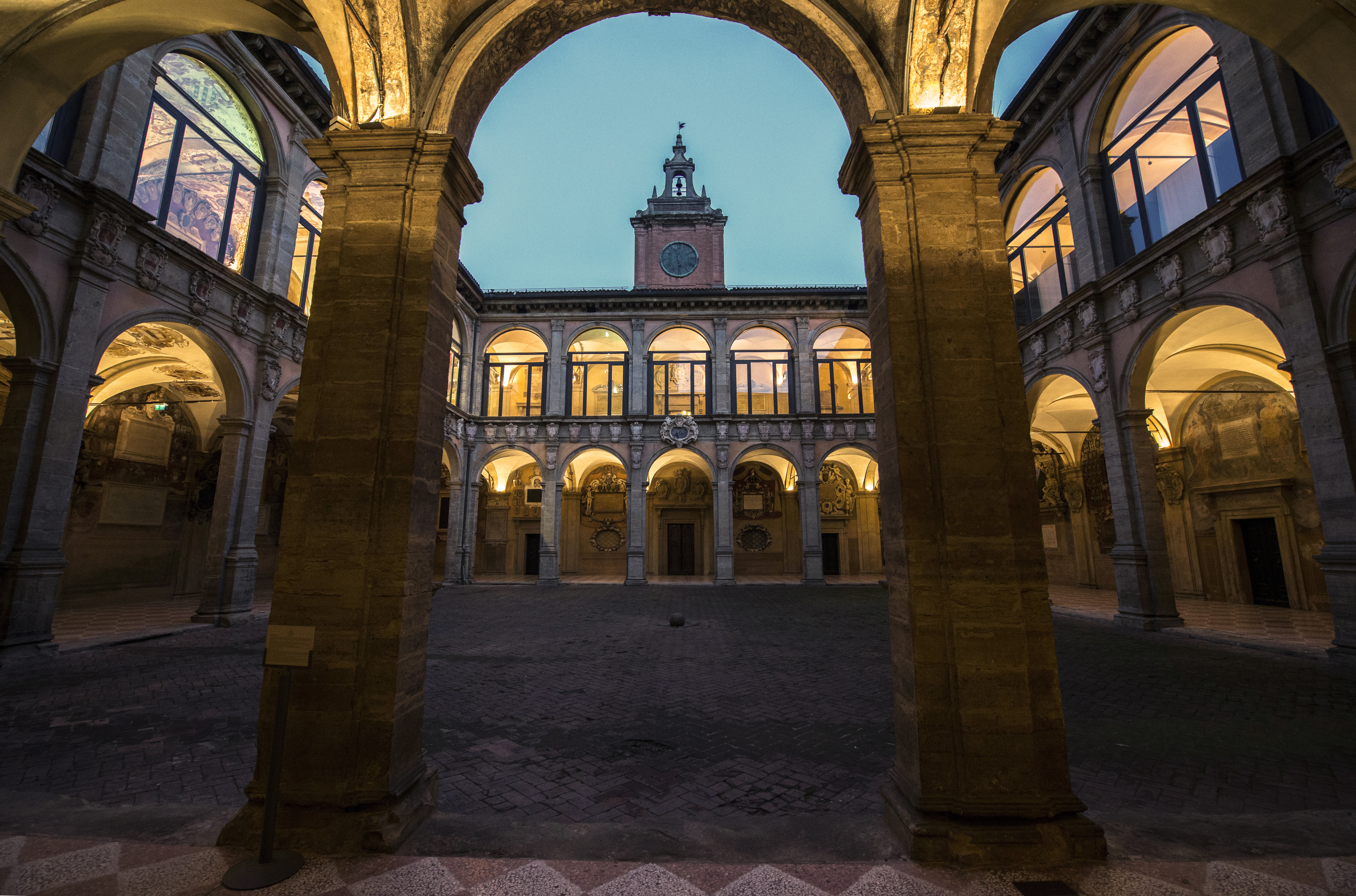
The University of Bologna in Italy, founded in 1088, is the world's oldest university in continuous operation.

=== Definition ===
The original Latin word universitas refers in general to "a number of persons associated into one body, a society, company, community, guild, corporation, etc". As urban town life and medieval guilds developed, specialized associations of students and teachers with collective legal rights (these rights were usually guaranteed by charters issued by princes, prelates, or their towns) became denominated by this general term. Like other guilds, they were self-regulating and determined the qualifications of their members.

In modern usage, the word has come to mean "an institution of higher education offering tuition in mainly non-vocational subjects and typically having the power to confer degrees". The earlier emphasis on its corporate organization is no longer the primary feature by which a modern university is recognized.

The original Latin word referred to degree-awarding institutions of learning in Western and Central Europe, where this form of legal organisation was prevalent and from where the institution spread around the world.

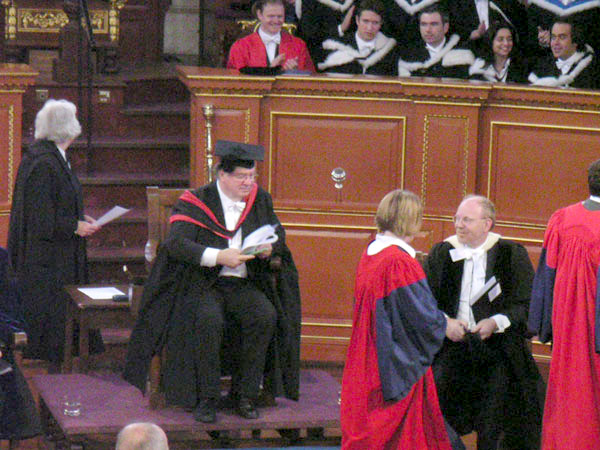
Graduation ceremony on Convocation day at the University of Oxford. The Pro-Vice-Chancellor in MA gown and hood, Proctor in official dress and new Doctors of Philosophy in scarlet full dress. Behind them, a bedel, a Doctor and Bachelors of Arts and Medicine graduate.

==== Academic freedom ====
An important idea in the definition of a university is the notion of academic freedom. The first documentary evidence of this comes from early in the life of the University of Bologna, which adopted an academic charter, the Constitutio Habita, in 1155 or 1158, which guaranteed the right of a traveling scholar to unhindered passage in the interests of education. Today, this is claimed as the origin of "academic freedom". On 18 September 1988, 430 university rectors signed the Magna Charta Universitatum, marking the 900th anniversary of Bologna's foundation. There is debate over the extent to which academic freedom at publicly funded universities is subject to accountability for the use of public resources; i.e., whether academics' research and teaching should support public goods such as social justice or whether there is also a prerogative to pursue knowledge for its own sake.

=== Antecedents ===
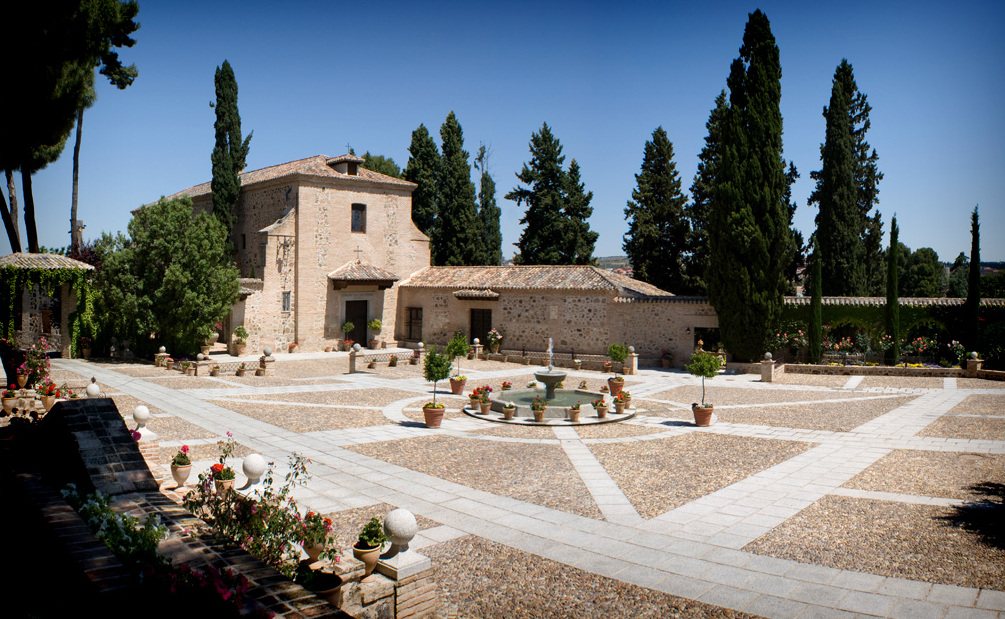
Agali monastery, founded around 590/600 CE, in the vicinity of Toledo, Spain, taught medicine and astronomy.

The School of Alexandria was established during the 2nd century A.D. Apart from subjects like theology, Christian philosophy and the Bible; science, mathematics and Greek and Roman literature, logic and the arts were also taught. The question-and-answer method of commentary began there, and blind students at the school were using wood-carving techniques to read and write. The first figures of the Church in Egypt were scholars rather than bishops, directors of the Catechetical School of Alexandria: Clement (160–215) and Origen (185–251).

In 425 CE, Roman emperor Theodosius II founded the Pandidakterion, later known as the University of Constantinople. The institution taught more than law and philosophy, including geography, music, astronomy, rhetoric, grammar and oratory. Notable teachers included Michael Psellos, John Xiphilinos, John Italos, Eustratius of Nicaea, Michael of Ephesus and John Mauropous, among others.

Nalanda mahavihara was established by emperor Kumaragupta I of the Gupta Empire around 427 CE, became a major Buddhist learning hub, attracting scholars like Xuanzang. It was destroyed in 1202 CE by Bakhtiyar Khilji. The characterization of Nalanda as a "university" in the modern sense has been challenged by scholars. They argue that while it was undoubtedly a major center of learning, comparing it directly to a modern university is historically imprecise.

During and after the mission of St Augustine to England, cathedral schools were established as the new dioceses were themselves created (Canterbury 597, Rochester 604, York 627, for example). Cathedral schools arose in major cities such as Chartres, Orleans, Paris, Laon, Reims or Rouen in France and Utrecht, Liege, Cologne, Metz, Speyer, Würzburg, Bamberg, Magdeburg, Hildesheim or Freising in Germany. Speyer was renowned for supplying the Holy Roman Empire with diplomats. The court of Henry I of England, was tied to the cathedral school of Laon.

Centers of learning were found in seventh-century Spain, both at major monasteries and at episcopal centers. Students at the monastery of Saints Cosmas and Damian, at Agali near Toledo, learned such scientific subjects as medicine and the rudiments of astronomy. In the heyday of the monastic schools in the 9th and 10th centuries, the teachings of important scholars such as Alcuin, Hrabanus Maurus, Heiric of Auxerre and Notker Balbulus raised the prestige of their abbeys and attracted pupils from afar to attend their courses.

An early institution is the Madrasa of Harran, founded in the late 8th century. Scholars occasionally call the University of al-Qarawiyyin (name given in 1963), founded as a mosque by Fatima al-Fihri in 859 CE, a university, although Jacques Verger writes that this is done out of scholarly convenience. Several scholars consider that al-Qarawiyyin was founded and run as a madrasa until after World War II. They date the transformation of the madrasa of al-Qarawiyyin into a university to its modern reorganization in 1963. In the wake of these reforms, al-Qarawiyyin was officially renamed "University of Al Quaraouiyine" two years later.

Some scholars, including George Makdisi, have argued that early medieval universities were influenced by the madrasas in Al-Andalus, the Emirate of Sicily, and the Middle East during the Crusades. Norman Daniel, however, views this argument as overstated. Universities and madrasas differed in several major respects. In 2013, Roy Lowe and Yoshihito Yasuhara claimed that the influences of scholarship from the Islamic world on the universities of Western Europe requires a reconsideration of the development of higher education, turning away from a concern with local institutional structures to a broader consideration within a global context.

=== Medieval Europe ===
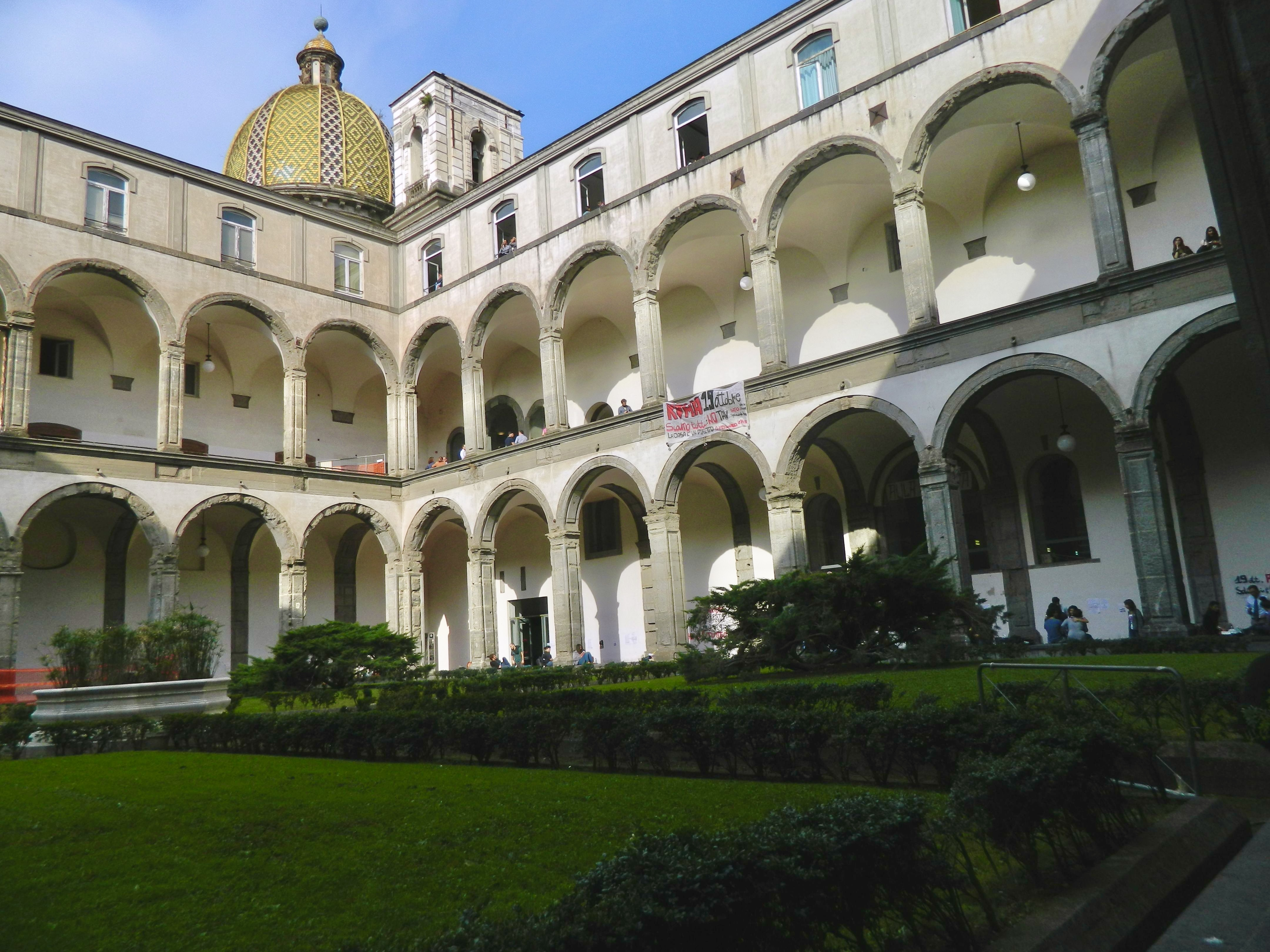
Established in 1224 by Frederick II, Holy Roman Emperor, the University of Naples Federico II in Italy is the world's oldest state-funded university in continuous operation.

Although there are antecedents, the modern university is generally regarded as a formal institution that has its origin in the Medieval Christian tradition. European higher education took place for hundreds of years in cathedral schools and monastic schools (scholae monasticae), in which monks and nuns taught classes; evidence of these immediate forerunners of the later university at many places dates back to the 6th century. In Europe, young men proceeded to university when they had completed their study of the trivium – the preparatory arts of grammar, rhetoric and dialectic or logic–and the quadrivium: arithmetic, geometry, music, and astronomy.

The earliest universities were developed under the aegis of the Latin Church by papal bull as studia generalia and perhaps from cathedral schools. However, it is possible that the development of cathedral schools into universities was quite rare, with the University of Paris being an exception. Later they were also founded by kings - but with prior papal approval. (University of Naples Federico II, Charles University in Prague, Jagiellonian University in Kraków) or municipal administrations (University of Cologne, University of Erfurt). Most of the early universities of the high medieval period were founded from pre-existing schools, usually when these schools were deemed to have become primarily sites of higher education. Some historians state that universities and cathedral schools were a continuation of the interest in learning promoted by monasteries. Pope Gregory VII was crucial in promoting and regulating the concept of modern university, as his 1079 Papal Decree ordered the regulated establishment of cathedral schools that transformed themselves into the first European universities.

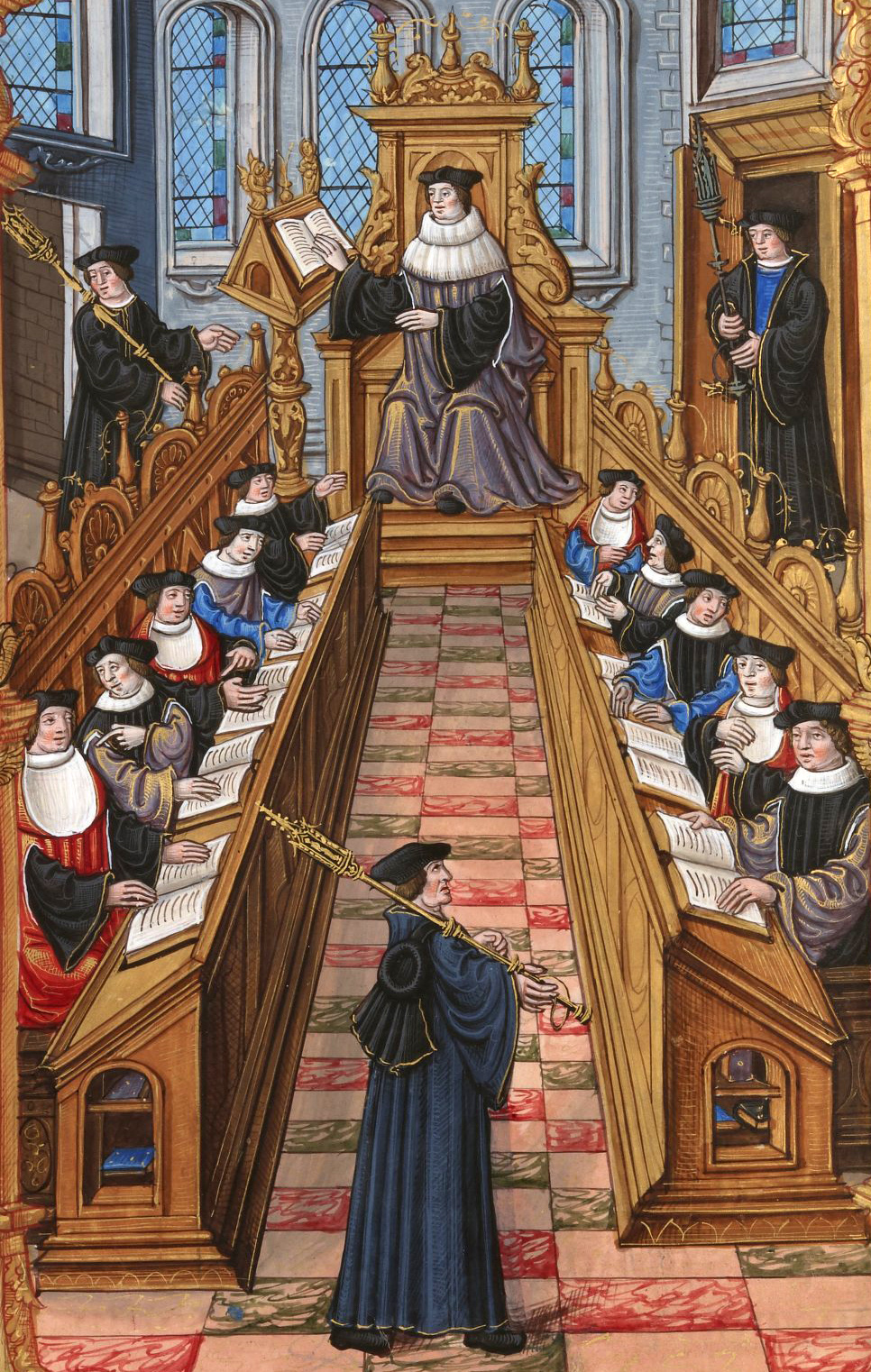
Meeting of doctors at the University of Paris. From a medieval manuscript.

The first three universities in Europe with a form of corporate/guild structure were the University of Bologna (c. 1180–1190), the University of Paris (c. 1208–1210, later associated with the Sorbonne), and the University of Oxford (c. 1200–1214). The University of Bologna began as a law school teaching the ius gentium or Roman law of peoples which was in demand across Europe for those defending the right of incipient nations against empire and church. The University of Bologna, or Alma Mater Studiorum, is widely recognized as the oldest university that is independent of any direct authority, such as a king, emperor, or religious organization. Bologna's claim to being the oldest university is based on its unique characteristics, such as its autonomy and its ability to grant degrees.

The conventional date for the start of teaching at Bologna of 1088, or 1087 according to some, records when Irnerius commenced teaching Emperor Justinian's 6th-century codification of Roman law, the Corpus Iuris Civilis, recently discovered at Pisa. Lay students arrived in the city from many lands entering into a contract to gain this knowledge, eventually organising themselves into Nationes, divided between that of the Cismontanes and that of the Ultramontanes. The students "had all the power ... and dominated the masters".

All over Europe, rulers and city governments began to create universities to satisfy a European thirst for knowledge, and the belief that society would benefit from the scholarly expertise generated from these institutions. Princes and leaders of city governments perceived the potential benefits of having a scholarly expertise developed with the ability to address difficult problems and achieve desired ends. The emergence of humanism was essential to this understanding of the possible utility of universities as well as the revival of interest in knowledge gained from ancient Greek texts.

The recovery of Aristotle's works – more than 3000 pages of it eventually translated – fuelled a spirit of inquiry into natural processes that had already begun to emerge in the 12th century. Some scholars believe that these works represented one of the most important document discoveries in Western intellectual history. Richard Dales, for instance, calls the discovery of Aristotle's works "a turning point in the history of Western thought." After Aristotle re-emerged, a community of scholars, primarily communicating in Latin, accelerated the process and practice of attempting to reconcile the thoughts of Greek antiquity, and especially ideas related to understanding the natural world, with those of the church. The efforts of this "scholasticism" were focused on applying Aristotelian logic and thoughts about natural processes to biblical passages and attempting to prove the viability of those passages through reason. This became the primary mission of lecturers, and the expectation of students.

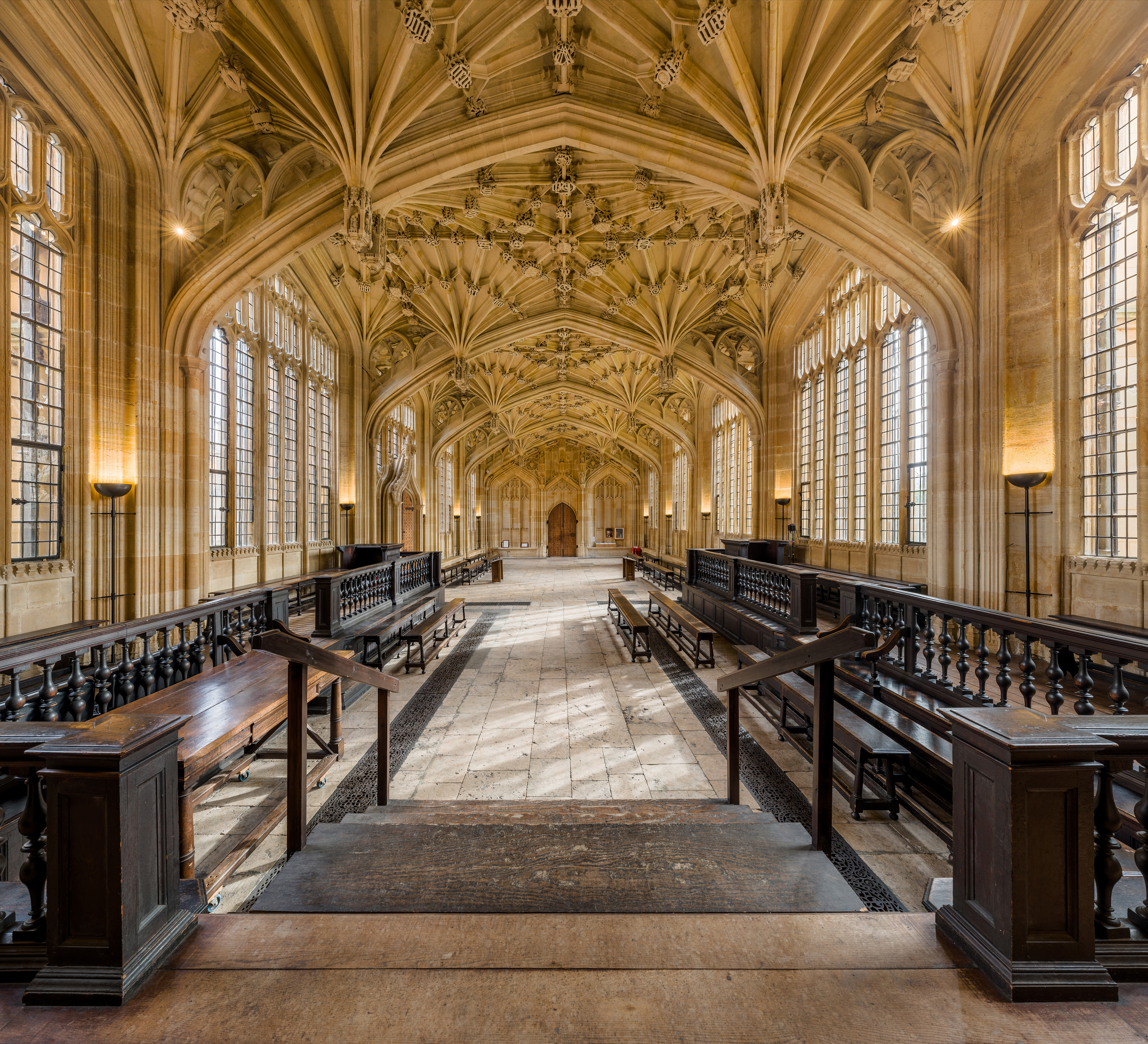
The University of Oxford is the oldest university in the English-speaking world.

The university culture developed differently in northern Europe than it did in the south, although the northern (primarily Germany, France and Great Britain) and southern universities (primarily Italy) did have many elements in common. Latin was the language of the university, used for all texts, lectures, disputations and examinations. Professors lectured on the books of Aristotle for logic, natural philosophy, and metaphysics; while Hippocrates, Galen, and Avicenna were used for medicine. Outside of these commonalities, great differences separated north and south, primarily in subject matter. Italian universities focused on law and medicine, while the northern universities focused on the arts and theology. The quality of instruction in the different areas of study varied, depending on the university's focus. This led scholars to travel north or south based on their interests and means. The universities also awarded different types of degrees. English, French and German universities usually awarded bachelor's degrees, with the exception of degrees in theology, for which the doctorate was more common. Italian universities awarded primarily doctorates. The distinction can be attributed to the intent of the degree holder after graduation – in the north the focus tended to be on acquiring teaching positions, while in the south students often went on to professional positions. The structure of northern universities tended to be modeled after the system of faculty governance developed at the University of Paris. Southern universities tended to be patterned after the student-controlled model begun at the University of Bologna. Among the southern universities, a further distinction has been noted between those of northern Italy, which followed the pattern of Bologna as a "self-regulating, independent corporation of scholars" and those of southern Italy and Iberia, which were "founded by royal and imperial charter to serve the needs of government."

=== Early modern universities ===
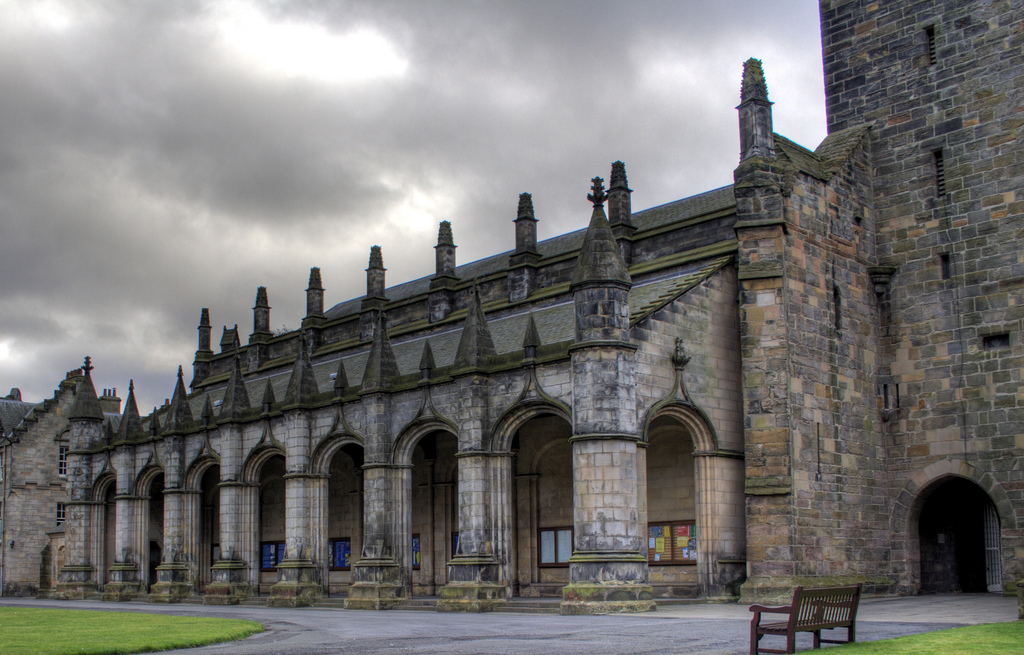
The University of St Andrews, founded in 1410, is Scotland's oldest university.

During the Early Modern period (approximately late 15th century to 1800), the universities of Europe would see a tremendous amount of growth, productivity and innovative research. At the end of the Middle Ages, about 400 years after the first European university was founded, there were 29 universities spread throughout Europe. In the 15th century, 28 new ones were created, with another 18 added between 1500 and 1625. This pace continued until by the end of the 18th century there were approximately 143 universities in Europe, with the highest concentrations in the Holy Roman Empire (34), Italian countries (26), France (25), and Spain (23) – this was close to a 500% increase over the number of universities toward the end of the Middle Ages. This number does not include the numerous universities that disappeared, or institutions that merged with other universities during this time. The identification of a university was not necessarily obvious during the early modern period, as the term is applied to a burgeoning number of institutions. In fact, the term "university" was not always used to designate a higher education institution. In Mediterranean countries, the term studium generale was still often used, while "Academy" was common in Northern European countries.

The propagation of universities was not necessarily a steady progression, as the 17th century was rife with events that adversely affected university expansion. Many wars, and especially the Thirty Years' War, disrupted the university landscape throughout Europe at different times. War, plague, famine, regicide, and changes in religious power and structure often adversely affected the societies that provided support for universities. Internal strife within the universities themselves, such as student brawling and absentee professors, acted to destabilize these institutions as well. Universities were also reluctant to give up older curricula, and the continued reliance on the works of Aristotle defied contemporary advancements in science and the arts. This era was also affected by the rise of the nation-state. As universities increasingly came under state control, or formed under the auspices of the state, the faculty governance model (begun by the University of Paris) became more and more prominent. Although the older student-controlled universities still existed, they slowly started to move toward this structural organization. Control of universities still tended to be independent, although university leadership was increasingly appointed by the state.

Although the structural model provided by the University of Paris, where student members are controlled by faculty "masters", provided a standard for universities, the application of this model took at least three different forms. There were universities that had a system of faculties whose teaching addressed a very specific curriculum; this model tended to train specialists. There was a collegiate or tutorial model based on the system at University of Oxford where teaching and organization was decentralized and knowledge was more of a generalist nature. There were also universities that combined these models, using the collegiate model but having a centralized organization.

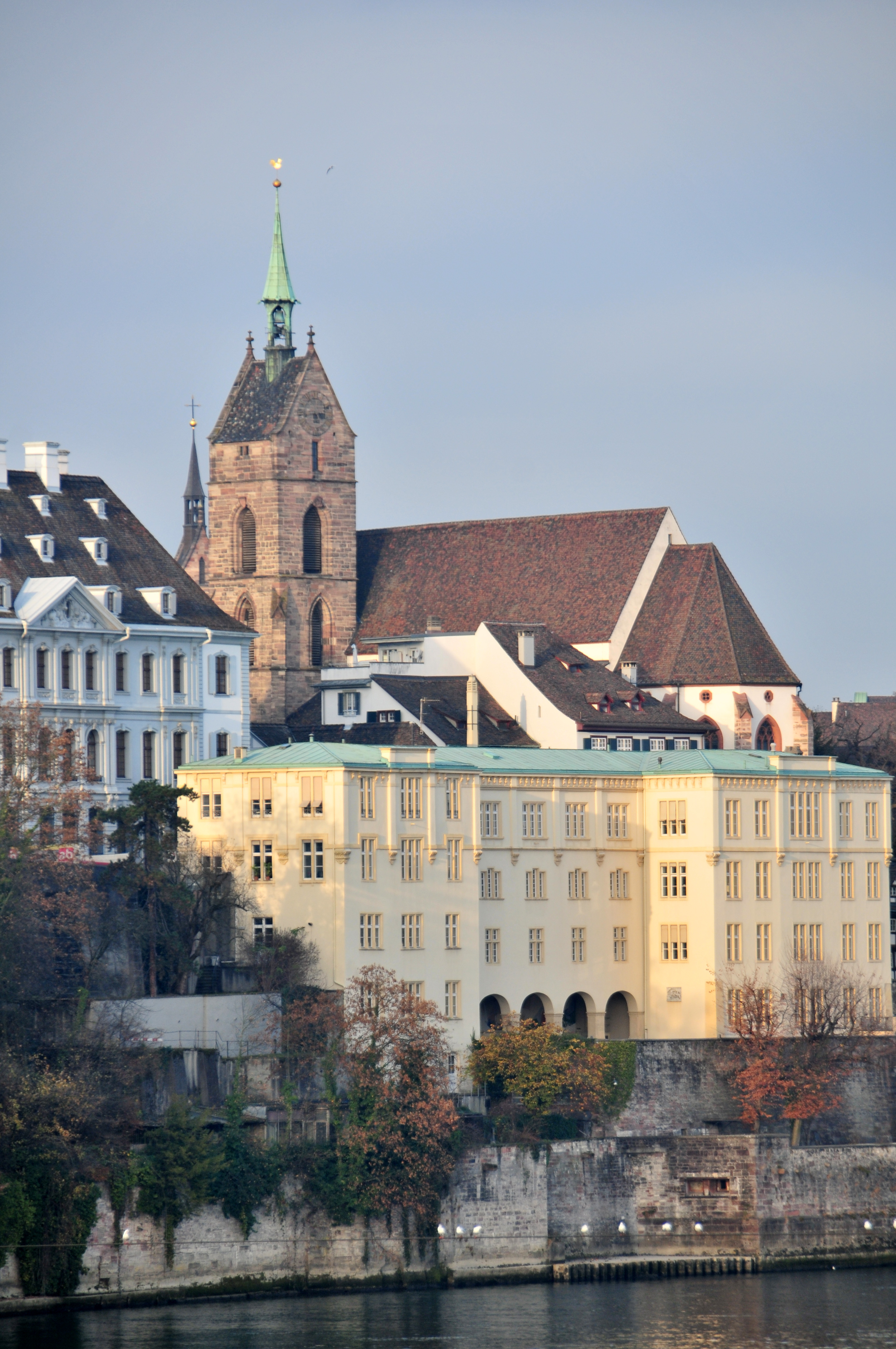
Old main building of the University of Basel – Switzerland's oldest university (1460). The university is among the birthplaces of Renaissance humanism.

Early Modern universities initially continued the curriculum and research of the Middle Ages: natural philosophy, logic, medicine, theology, mathematics, astronomy, astrology, law, grammar and rhetoric. Aristotle was prevalent throughout the curriculum, while medicine also depended on Galen and Arabic scholarship. The importance of humanism for changing this state-of-affairs cannot be underestimated. Once humanist professors joined the university faculty, they began to transform the study of grammar and rhetoric through the studia humanitatis. Humanist professors focused on the ability of students to write and speak with distinction, to translate and interpret classical texts, and to live honorable lives. Other scholars within the university were affected by the humanist approaches to learning and their linguistic expertise in relation to ancient texts, as well as the ideology that advocated the ultimate importance of those texts. Professors of medicine such as Niccolò Leoniceno, Thomas Linacre and William Cop were often trained in and taught from a humanist perspective as well as translated important ancient medical texts. The critical mindset imparted by humanism was imperative for changes in universities and scholarship. For instance, Andreas Vesalius was educated in a humanist fashion before producing a translation of Galen, whose ideas he verified through his own dissections. In law, Andreas Alciatus infused the Corpus Juris with a humanist perspective, while Jacques Cujas humanist writings were paramount to his reputation as a jurist. Philipp Melanchthon cited the works of Erasmus as a highly influential guide for connecting theology back to original texts, which was important for the reform at Protestant universities. Galileo Galilei, who taught at the Universities of Pisa and Padua, and Martin Luther, who taught at the University of Wittenberg (as did Melanchthon), also had humanist training. The task of the humanists was to slowly permeate the university; to increase the humanist presence in professorships and chairs, syllabi and textbooks so that published works would demonstrate the humanistic ideal of science and scholarship.

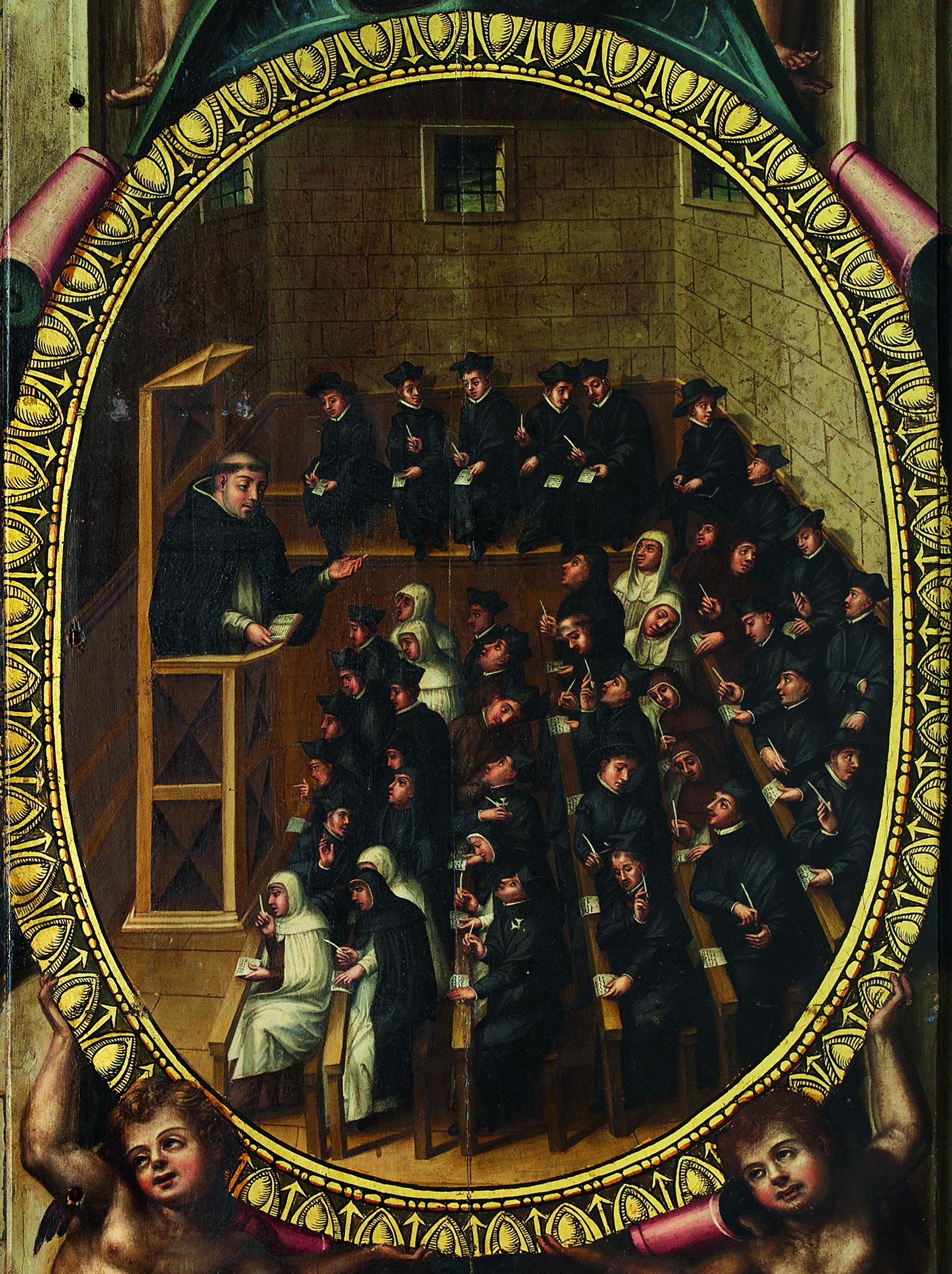
17th-century classroom at the University of Salamanca

Although the initial focus of the humanist scholars in the university was the discovery, exposition and insertion of ancient texts and languages into the university, and the ideas of those texts into society generally, their influence was ultimately quite progressive. The emergence of classical texts brought new ideas and led to a more creative university climate (as the notable list of scholars above attests to). A focus on knowledge coming from self, from the human, has a direct implication for new forms of scholarship and instruction, and was the foundation for what is commonly known as the humanities. This disposition toward knowledge manifested in not simply the translation and propagation of ancient texts, but also their adaptation and expansion. For instance, Vesalius was imperative for advocating the use of Galen, but he also invigorated this text with experimentation, disagreements and further research. The propagation of these texts, especially within the universities, was greatly aided by the emergence of the printing press and the beginning of the use of the vernacular, which allowed for the printing of relatively large texts at reasonable prices.

Examining the influence of humanism on scholars in medicine, mathematics, astronomy and physics may suggest that humanism and universities were a strong impetus for the scientific revolution. Although the connection between humanism and the scientific discovery may very well have begun within the confines of the university, the connection has been commonly perceived as having been severed by the changing nature of science during the Scientific Revolution. Historians such as Richard S. Westfall have argued that the overt traditionalism of universities inhibited attempts to re-conceptualize nature and knowledge and caused an indelible tension between universities and scientists. This resistance to changes in science may have been a significant factor in driving many scientists away from the university and toward private benefactors, usually in princely courts, and associations with newly forming scientific societies.

Other historians find incongruity in the proposition that the very place where the vast number of the scholars that influenced the scientific revolution received their education should also be the place that inhibits their research and the advancement of science. In fact, more than 80% of the European scientists between 1450 and 1650 included in the Dictionary of Scientific Biography were university trained, of which approximately 45% held university posts. It was the case that the academic foundations remaining from the Middle Ages were stable, and they did provide for an environment that fostered considerable growth and development. There was considerable reluctance on the part of universities to relinquish the symmetry and comprehensiveness provided by the Aristotelian system, which was effective as a coherent system for understanding and interpreting the world. However, university professors still have some autonomy, at least in the sciences, to choose epistemological foundations and methods. For instance, Melanchthon and his disciples at University of Wittenberg were instrumental for integrating Copernican mathematical constructs into astronomical debate and instruction. Another example was the short-lived but fairly rapid adoption of Cartesian epistemology and methodology in European universities, and the debates surrounding that adoption, which led to more mechanistic approaches to scientific problems as well as demonstrated an openness to change. There are many examples which belie the commonly perceived intransigence of universities. Although universities may have been slow to accept new sciences and methodologies as they emerged, when they did accept new ideas it helped to convey legitimacy and respectability, and supported the scientific changes through providing a stable environment for instruction and material resources.

Regardless of the way the tension between universities, individual scientists, and the scientific revolution itself is perceived, there was a discernible impact on the way that university education was constructed. Aristotelian epistemology provided a coherent framework not simply for knowledge and knowledge construction, but also for the training of scholars within the higher education setting. The creation of new scientific constructs during the scientific revolution, and the epistemological challenges that were inherent within this creation, initiated the idea of both the autonomy of science and the hierarchy of the disciplines. Instead of entering higher education to become a "general scholar" immersed in becoming proficient in the entire curriculum, there emerged a type of scholar that put science first and viewed it as a vocation in itself. The divergence between those focused on science and those still entrenched in the idea of a general scholar exacerbated the epistemological tensions that were already beginning to emerge.

The epistemological tensions between scientists and universities were also heightened by the economic realities of research during this time, as individual scientists, associations and universities were vying for limited resources. There was also competition from the formation of new colleges funded by private benefactors and designed to provide free education to the public, or established by local governments to provide a knowledge-hungry populace with an alternative to traditional universities. Even when universities supported new scientific endeavors, and the university provided foundational training and authority for the research and conclusions, they could not compete with the resources available through private benefactors.

By the end of the early modern period, the structure and orientation of higher education had changed in ways that are eminently recognizable for the modern context. Aristotle was no longer a force providing the epistemological and methodological focus for universities and a more mechanistic orientation was emerging. The hierarchical place of theological knowledge had for the most part been displaced and the humanities had become a fixture, and a new openness was beginning to take hold in the construction and dissemination of knowledge that were to become imperative for the formation of the modern state.

=== Modern universities ===
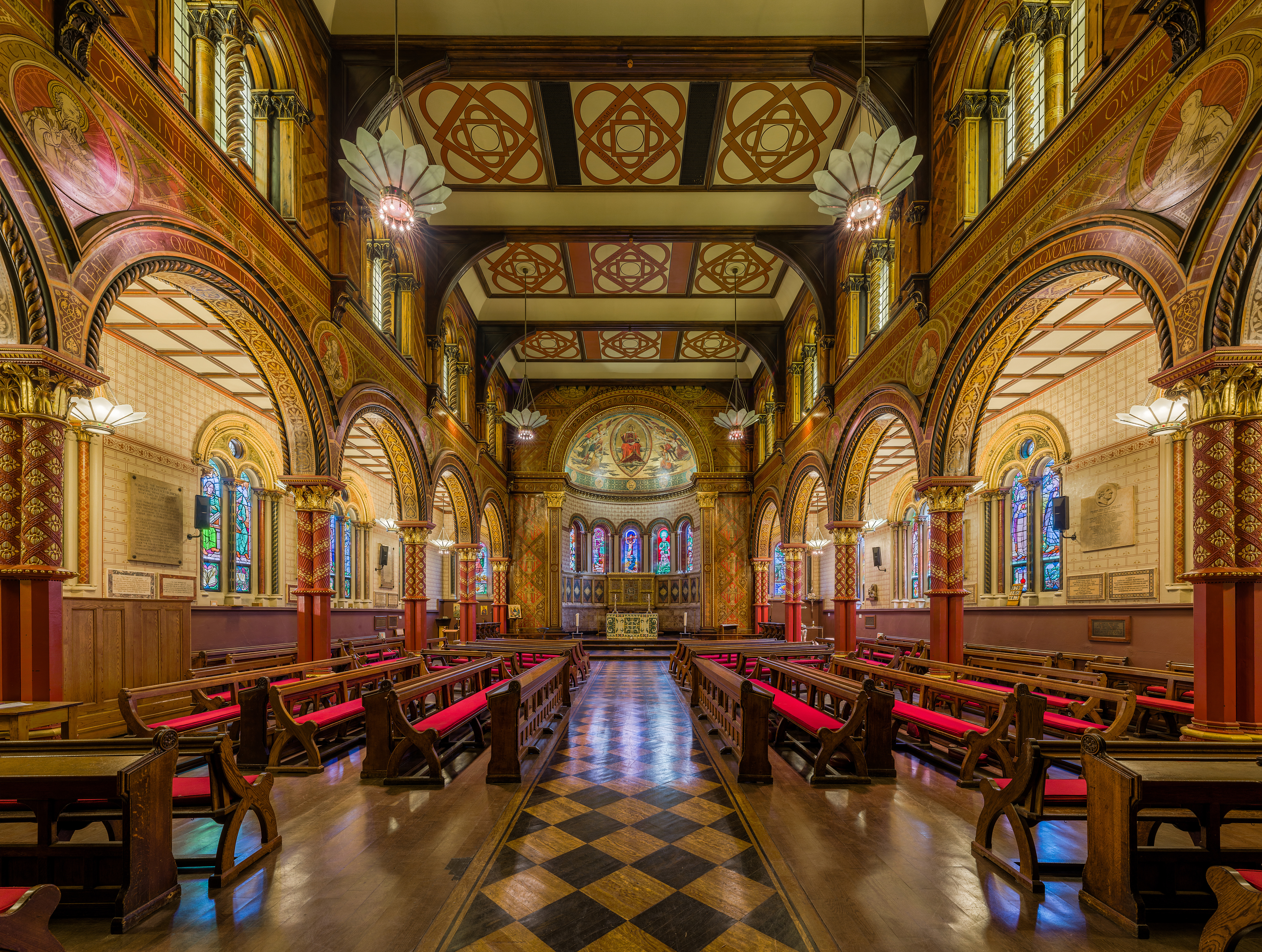
King's College London, established by Royal Charter having been founded by King George IV and Duke of Wellington in 1829, is one of the founding colleges of the University of London.

Modern universities constitute a guild or quasi-guild system. This facet of the university system did not change due to its peripheral standing in an industrialized economy; as commerce developed between towns in Europe during the Middle Ages, though other guilds stood in the way of developing commerce and therefore were eventually abolished, the scholars guild did not. According to historian Elliot Krause, "The university and scholars' guilds held onto their power over membership, training, and workplace because early capitalism was not interested in it."

By the 18th century, universities published their own research journals and by the 19th century, the German and the French university models had arisen. The German, or Humboldtian model, was conceived by Wilhelm von Humboldt and based on Friedrich Schleiermacher's liberal ideas pertaining to the importance of freedom, seminars, and laboratories in universities. The French university model involved strict discipline and control over every aspect of the university.

Until the 19th century, religion played a significant role in university curriculum; however, the role of religion in research universities decreased during that century. By the end of the 19th century, the German university model had spread around the world. Universities concentrated on science in the 19th and 20th centuries and became increasingly accessible to the masses. In the United States, the Johns Hopkins University was the first to adopt the (German) research university model and pioneered the adoption of that model by most American universities. When Johns Hopkins was founded in 1876, "nearly the entire faculty had studied in Germany." In England, the move from Industrial Revolution to modernity saw the arrival of new civic university colleges with an emphasis on science and engineering in the late 19th century, which became the redbrick universities in the early 20th century. In Scotland, the Andersonian Institute, founded in the late 18th century with a similar emphasis, became the University of Strathclyde in the 1960s as the first new university in Scotland since Edinburgh in the 16th century. The British also established universities worldwide, and higher education became available to the masses not only in Europe.

In 1963, the Robbins Report on universities in the United Kingdom concluded that such institutions should have four main "objectives essential to any properly balanced system: instruction in skills; the promotion of the general powers of the mind so as to produce not mere specialists but rather cultivated men and women; to maintain research in balance with teaching, since teaching should not be separated from the advancement of learning and the search for truth; and to transmit a common culture and common standards of citizenship."

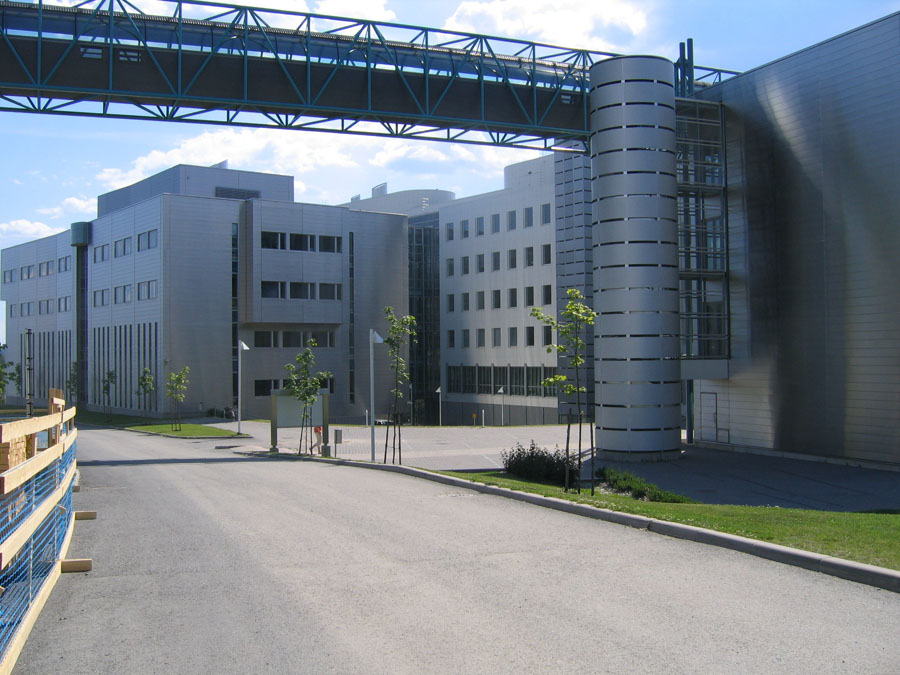
Tampere University in the city of Tampere, Finland is well known for its highly modern look. The buildings (part of central campus of university) in picture are from 2003.

In the early 21st century, concerns were raised over the increasing managerialisation and standardisation of universities worldwide. Neo-liberal management models have in this sense been critiqued for creating "corporate universities (where) power is transferred from faculty to managers, economic justifications dominate, and the familiar 'bottom line' eclipses pedagogical or intellectual concerns". Academics' understanding of time, pedagogical pleasure, vocation, and collegiality have been cited as possible ways of alleviating such problems.

=== National universities ===
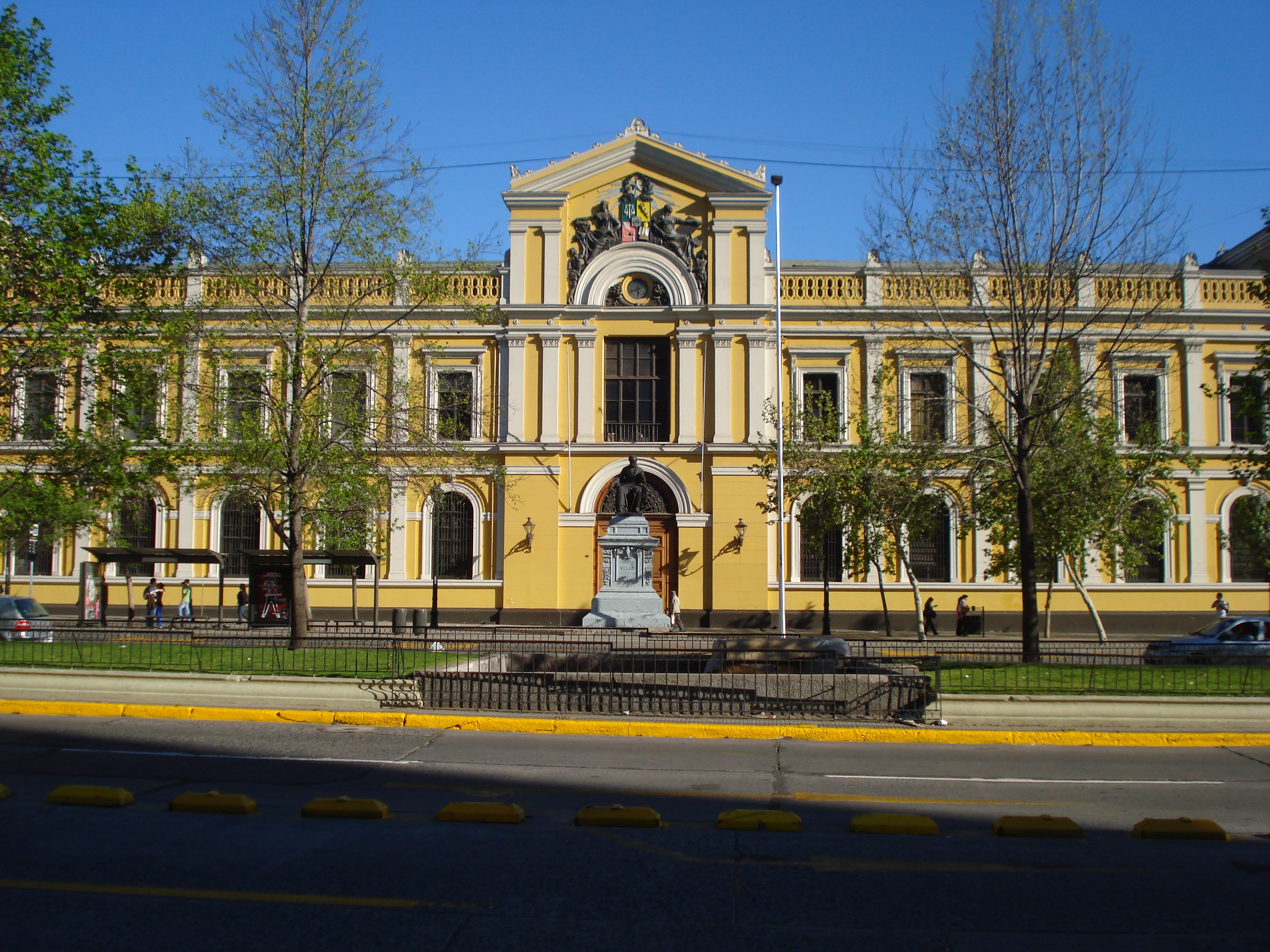
The Central House building of the University of Chile, in Santiago, a public university established in 1842

A national university is generally a university created or run by a national state but at the same time represents a state autonomic institution which functions as a completely independent body inside of the same state. Some national universities are closely associated with national cultural, religious or political aspirations, for instance the National University of Ireland, which formed partly from the Catholic University of Ireland which was created almost immediately and specifically in answer to the non-denominational universities which had been set up in Ireland in 1850. In the years leading up to the Easter Rising, and in no small part a result of the Gaelic Romantic revivalists, the NUI collected a large amount of information on the Irish language and Irish culture. Reforms in Argentina were the result of the University Revolution of 1918 and its posterior reforms by incorporating values that sought for a more equal and laic higher education system.

=== Intergovernmental universities ===
Universities created by bilateral or multilateral treaties between states are intergovernmental. An example is the Academy of European Law, which offers training in European law to lawyers, judges, barristers, solicitors, in-house counsel and academics. EUCLID (Pôle Universitaire Euclide, Euclid University) is chartered as a university and umbrella organization dedicated to sustainable development in signatory countries, and the United Nations University engages in efforts to resolve the pressing global problems that are of concern to the United Nations, its peoples and member states. The European University Institute, a post-graduate university specialized in the social sciences, is officially an intergovernmental organization, set up by the member states of the European Union.

== Organization ==
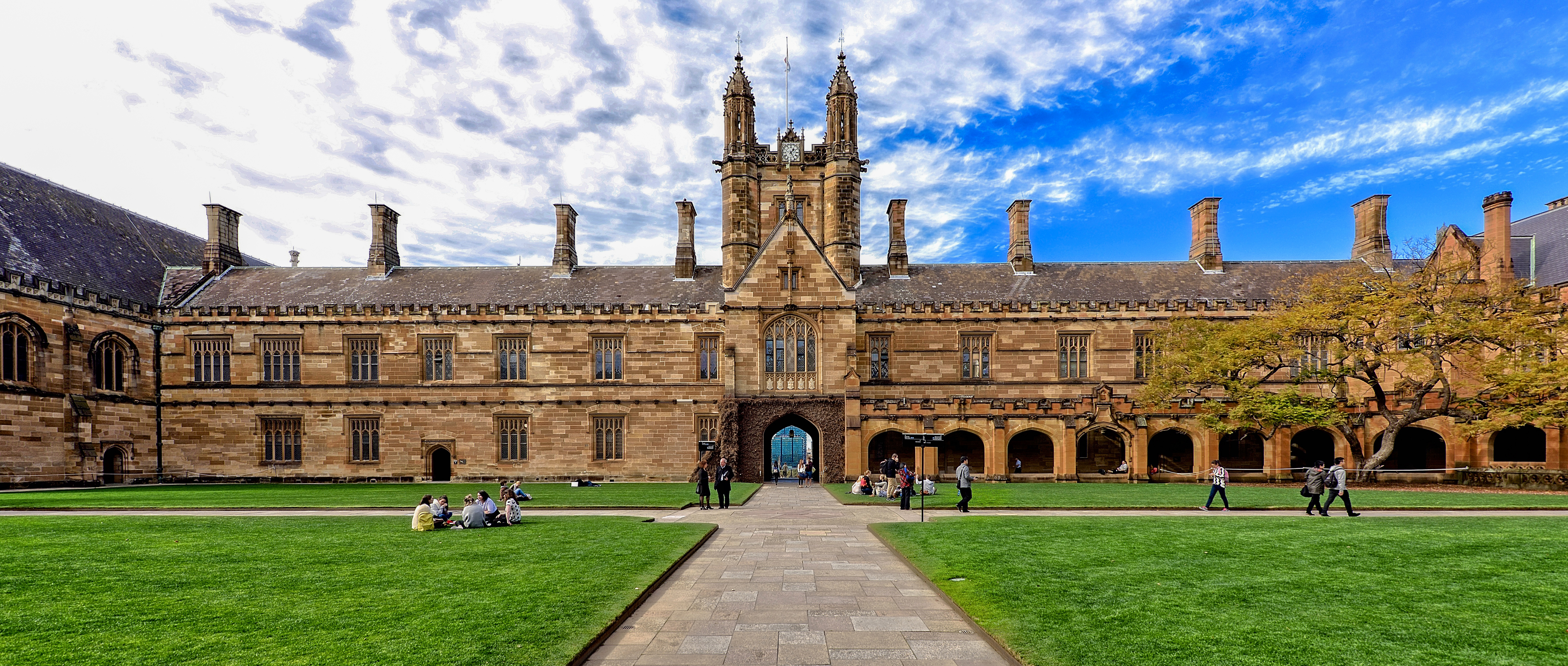
The University of Sydney is Australia's oldest university.

Although each institution is organized differently, nearly all universities have a board of trustees; a president, chancellor, or rector; at least one vice president, vice-chancellor, or vice-rector; and deans of various divisions. Universities are generally divided into a number of academic departments, schools or faculties. They review financial requests and budget proposals and then allocate funds for each university in the system. They also approve new programs of instruction and cancel or make changes in existing programs. In addition, they plan for the further coordinated growth and development of the various institutions of higher education in the state or country. Many universities in the world have a considerable degree of financial, research and pedagogical autonomy. Private universities are privately funded and generally have broader independence from state policies.

== Around the world ==
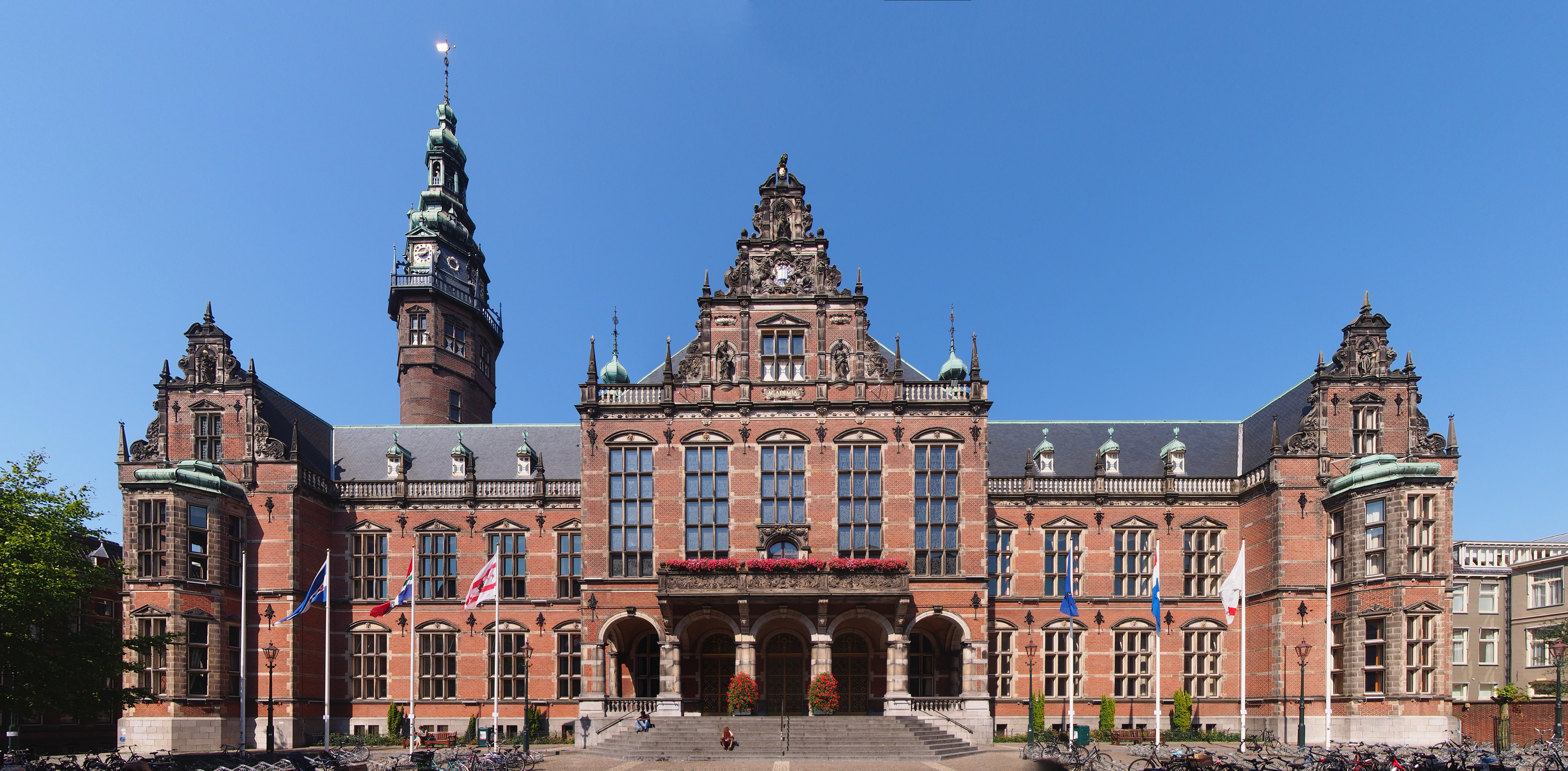
The University of Groningen in the Netherlands was founded in 1614.

The funding and organization of universities varies widely between different countries around the world. In some countries universities are predominantly funded by the state, while in others funding may come from donors or from fees which students attending the university must pay. In some countries the vast majority of students attend university in their local town, while in other countries universities attract students from all over the world, and may provide university accommodation for their students.

== Classification ==
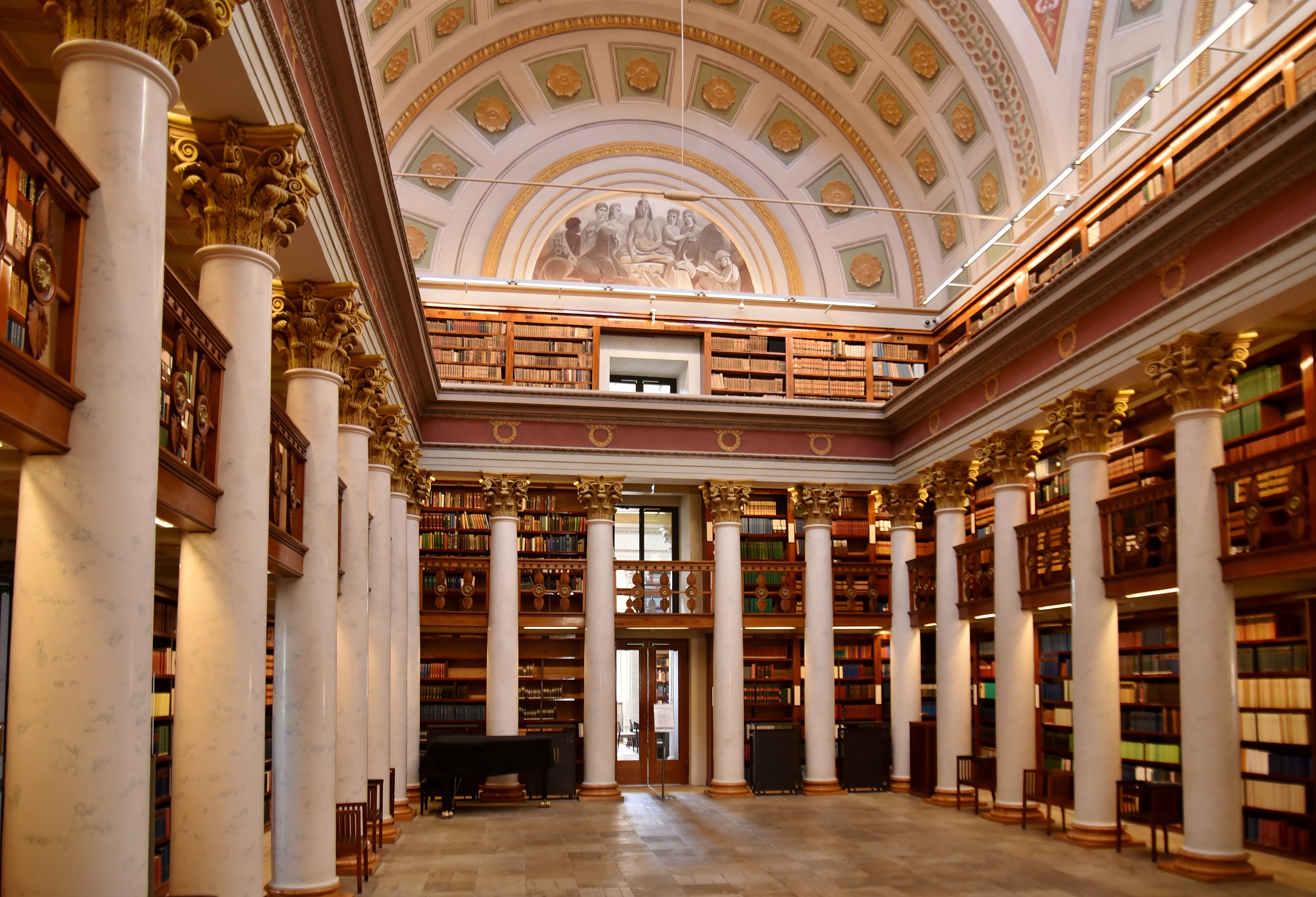
Interior of the National Library of Finland, which is part of the University of Helsinki

The definition of a university varies widely, even within some countries. Where there is clarification, it is usually set by a government agency. For example:

In Australia, the Tertiary Education Quality and Standards Agency (TEQSA) is Australia's independent national regulator of the higher education sector. Students rights within university are also protected by the Education Services for Overseas Students Act (ESOS).

In the United States there is no nationally standardized definition for the term university, although the term has traditionally been used to designate research institutions and was once reserved for doctorate-granting research institutions. Some states, such as Massachusetts, will only grant a school "university status" if it grants at least two doctoral degrees.

In the United Kingdom, the Privy Council is responsible for approving the use of the word university in the name of an institution, under the terms of the Further and Higher Education Act 1992.

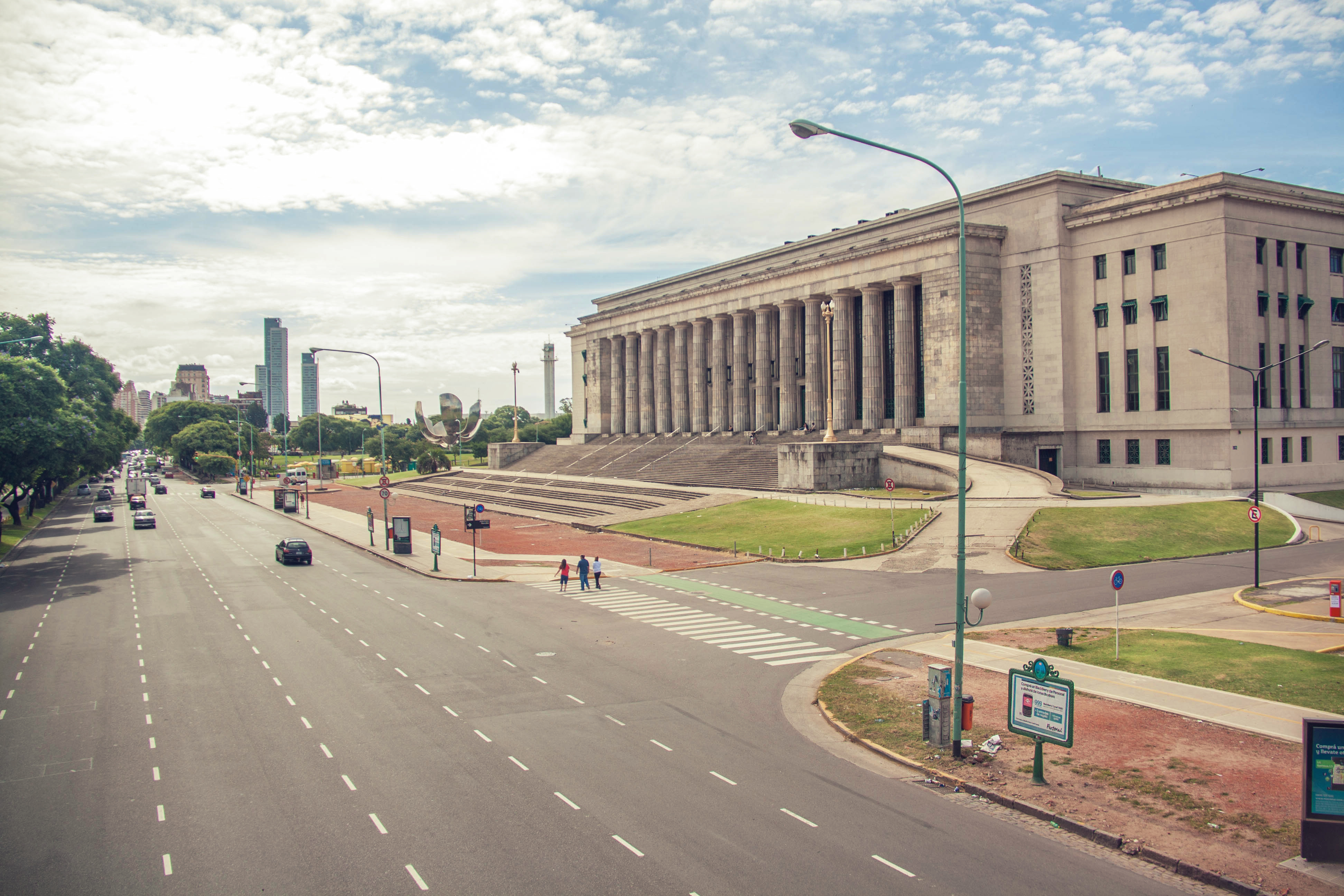
Faculty of Law of the University of Buenos Aires, many times ranked the best in Latin America by QS Rankings and

In India, a new designation deemed universities has been created for institutions of higher education that are not universities, but work at a very high standard in a specific area of study ("An Institution of Higher Education, other than universities, working at a very high standard in specific area of study, can be declared by the Central Government on the advice of the University Grants Commission as an Institution (Deemed-to-be-university). Institutions that are 'deemed-to-be-university' enjoy the academic status and the privileges of a university. Through this provision many schools that are commercial in nature and have been established just to exploit the demand for higher education have sprung up.

In Canada, college generally refers to a two-year, non-degree-granting institution, while university connotes a four-year, degree-granting institution. Universities may be sub-classified (as in the Macleans rankings) into large research universities with many PhD-granting programs and medical schools (for example, McGill University); "comprehensive" universities that have some PhDs but are not geared toward research (such as Waterloo); and smaller, primarily undergraduate universities (such as St. Francis Xavier).

In Germany, universities are institutions of higher education which have the power to confer bachelor, master and PhD degrees. They are explicitly recognised as such by law and cannot be founded without government approval. The term Universität (i.e. the German term for university) is protected by law and any use without official approval is a criminal offense. Most of them are public institutions, though a few private universities exist. Such universities are always research universities. Apart from these universities, Germany has other institutions of higher education (Hochschule, Fachhochschule). Fachhochschule means a higher education institution which is similar to the former polytechnics in the British education system, the English term used for these German institutions is usually 'university of applied sciences'. They can confer master's degrees but no PhDs. They are similar to the model of teaching universities with less research and the research undertaken being highly practical. Hochschule can refer to various kinds of institutions, often specialised in a certain field (e.g. music, fine arts, business). They might or might not have the power to award PhD degrees, depending on the respective government legislation. If they award PhD degrees, their rank is considered equivalent to that of universities proper (Universität), if not, their rank is equivalent to universities of applied sciences.

== Colloquial usage ==
Colloquially, the term university may be used to describe a phase in one's life: "When I was at university..." (in the United States and Ireland, college is often used instead: "When I was in college..."). In Ireland, Australia, New Zealand, Canada, the United Kingdom, Nigeria, the Netherlands, Spain and the German-speaking countries, university is often contracted to uni. In Ghana, New Zealand, Bangladesh and in South Africa it is sometimes called "varsity" (although this has become uncommon in New Zealand in recent years). "Varsity" was also common usage in the UK in the 19th century.

== Cost ==
In many countries, students are required to pay tuition fees. Many students look to get 'student grants' to cover the cost of university. In 2016, the average outstanding student loan balance per borrower in the United States was US$30,000. In many U.S. states, costs are anticipated to rise for students as a result of decreased state funding given to public universities. Many universities in the United States offer students the opportunity to apply for financial scholarships to help pay for tuition based on academic achievement.

There are several major exceptions on tuition fees. In many European countries, it is possible to study without tuition fees. Public universities in Nordic countries were entirely without tuition fees until around 2005. Denmark, Sweden and Finland then moved to put in place tuition fees for foreign students. Citizens of EU and EEA member states and citizens from Switzerland remain exempted from tuition fees, and the amounts of public grants granted to promising foreign students were increased to offset some of the impact. The situation in Germany is similar; public universities usually do not charge tuition fees apart from a small administrative fee. For degrees of a postgraduate professional level sometimes tuition fees are levied. Private universities, however, almost always charge tuition fees.

== See also ==
- Alternative university
- Alumni
- Art school
- Catholic university
- College and university rankings
- Corporate university
- International university
- Land-grant university
- Liberal arts college
- List of academic disciplines
- List of admission tests to colleges and universities
- Lists of universities and colleges
- Medieval universities
- Pontifical university
- Quadrivium
- Science tourism
- University student retention
- University system
- Urban university
