= Eustratius =

Eustratius or Eustratios, in modern transliteration Efstratios (Greek: Εὐστράτιος/Greek: Ευστράτιος) is a Greek given name. Its diminutive form is Stratos (Greek: Στράτος) or Stratis (Greek: Στρατής or Greek: Στράτης).

== Places ==
- Agios Efstratios, an island in the northern Aegean Sea, Greece

== People with the given name ==
- Eustratios of Constantinople, author of Refutation (after 582)
- Eustratios, monastic name of Theophylact (son of Michael I) (c. 793–849)
- Eustratios of Antioch, 10th century Patriarch of Antioch
- Eustratius of Nicaea (c. 1050/1060–c. 1120), bishop of Nicaea
- Eustratius Garidas, patriarch of Constantinople, 1081–1084
- Stratis Myrivilis (Efstratios; 1890–1969), Greek writer (pseudonym)
- Stratos Apostolakis (Efstratios; born 1964), Greek professional football player
- Efstratios Grivas (born 1966), Greek chess grandmaster
- Efstratios Gidopoulos, president of AEK Athens in 1988–1991
- Stratos Perperoglou (Efstratios; born 1984), Greek professional basketball player

== See also ==
- Stratis (disambiguation)
- Saint Eustratius (disambiguation)
- Stratos (disambiguation)
