= Stratus =

Stratus may refer to:

== Weather ==
- Stratus cloud, a cloud type
  - Nimbostratus cloud, a cloud type
  - Stratocumulus cloud, a cloud type
  - Altostratus cloud, a cloud type
  - Altostratus undulatus cloud, a cloud type
  - Cirrostratus cloud, a cloud type

== Music ==
- Stratus (English band), a 1980s hard rock band
- Stratus (Serbian band), a heavy metal band formed in 2002
- "Stratus" (song), by Moments in Grace, 2004
- "Stratus", a song by Billy Cobham from Spectrum, 1973

== Technology ==
- Dodge Stratus, an automobile
- Stratus Technologies, a technology firm
- Swing Stratus, a German paraglider design

== Military ==
- Stratus (missile family), a family of cruise missiles under development

== People ==
- Trish Stratus (born 1975), Canadian professional wrestler

== Places ==
- Strati, Crete, a village in Crete
- Stratus (Acarnania), a city of ancient Acarnania, Greece
- The ancient name for the city of Stratos (Achaea)
- Stratus (building), a high-rise building in Seattle, Washington, US
- Mount Stratus, a mountain in Colorado

== See also ==
- Stratas, a surname
- Stratos (disambiguation)
- Stratum, a layer of sedimentary rock or soil
