= Heliodorus (6th-century philosopher) =

Heliodorus (Greek: Ἡλιόδωρος) is cited as the author of a work titled Commentary (dated 564 AD), which has been preserved, on the Introduction or Rudiments of Paulus Alexandrinus, the 4th century Alexandrian astrologer. The name "Heliodorus" appears only on the later of two groups of manuscripts, and so is somewhat doubtful. Leendert Westerink has argued that the commentary consists of notes of lectures, most likely given by the 6th-century philosopher and astrologer, Olympiodorus, in 564 AD. The Greek text of his commentary on Aristotle's Nicomachean Ethics has been published in vol. 19.2 of Commentaria in Aristotelem Graeca (CAG).
