= Stratos =

Stratos may refer to:

== Personal name ==
=== Surname ===
- Andreas Stratos (1905–1981), Greek politician and historian
- Demetrio Stratos (1945–1979), Italian vocalist, multi-instrumentalist, and music researcher
- Nikolaos Stratos (1872–1922), Greek politician and Prime Minister

=== Given name ===
Stratos (Greek: Στράτος) is a diminutive form of the Greek given name Eustratius:

- Stratos Apostolakis (born 1964), Greek footballer
- Stratos Dionysiou (1935–1990), Greek singer
- Stratos Perperoglou (born 1984), Greek basketball player
- Stratos Tzortzoglou (born 1965), Greek actor

=== Fictional characters ===
- President Stratos Spheros, from Pac-Man and the Ghostly Adventures
- Stratos (Masters of the Universe), from Masters of the Universe (1983)
- Stratos, the Titan of Air, from 1994 video game Ultima VIII: Pagan
- Stratos, the Wind Titan, from Disney's 1997 film Hercules
- Stratos, from 2000 video game Sacrifice
- Lockon Stratos, from 2007 anime Mobile Suit Gundam 00
- Einhart Stratos, from Magical Girl Lyrical Nanoha ViVid (2009)

== Businesses and brands ==
- Stratos Boats, a boat manufacturer
- Stratos Global Corporation, a telecommunications company
- Triangle Stratos, a New Zealand television network

== Cities ==
- Stratos (Achaea), a city of ancient Achaea
- Stratos, Greece, an ancient city in Aetolia-Acarnania and modern municipality

== Other uses ==
- Stratos (film), a 2014 Greek film
- Stratos (lake), near Stratos, Greece
- Icaro Stratos, an Italian rigid wing hang glider
- Lancia Stratos HF, a motor car
- New Stratos, a motor car by Manifattura Automobili Torino
- Ligeti Stratos, 1980s Australian ultralight aircraft
- A proposed data center associated with Ruby Pipeline in Utah

== See also ==
- Stratus (disambiguation)
