= Stratis =

Stratis may refer to:

- Stratis (configuration daemon), a user-level file system for Linux
- Stratis (Greyhawk), a deity from the Greyhawk campaign setting for the Dungeons & Dragons fantasy role-playing game
- Ai Stratis or Agios Efstratios (Greek: Άη Στράτης), a Greek island
- Stratis, a fictional island in the 2013 video game Arma 3, based on Agios Efstratios, Greece

== People with the given name ==
- Stratis Eleftheriades (1889–1983), Greek art critic, patron and publisher
- Stratis Haviaras (1935–2020), author in Greek and English
- Stratis Mastrokyriakos (born 1967), professional football (soccer) coach and former player
- Stratis Myrivilis (1890–1969), Greek writer
- Stratis Paschalis (born 1958), Greek poet, novelist and translator

== See also ==
- Eustratius (disambiguation),
- Stratis (Greek: Στρατής), a diminutive form of the Greek given name Efstratios; see Eustratius
