= Saint Eustratius =

Saint Eustratius may refer to:

== People ==
- Eustratius the Wonderworker
- Eustratius of Antioch
- Eustratius, companion of Orestes of Cappadocia

== Places ==
- Agios Efstratios, Greek island

== See also ==
- Saint Eustace, also spelled Eustachius or Eustathius
