= John Philoponus =

Byzantine philosopher (c.490–c.570)

- Born: c. 490; Alexandria, Province of Egypt, Eastern Roman Empire
- Died: c. 570

Education
- Academic advisor: Ammonius Hermiae

Philosophical work
- Era: Medieval philosophy
- Region: Western philosophy
- Main interests: Theology, natural philosophy, mathematics
- Notable ideas: Theory of impetus Kalam cosmological argument

John Philoponus (/fɪˈlɒpənəs/; Ancient Greek: Ἰωάννης ὁ Φιλόπονος, Ioánnis o Philóponos; c. 490 – c. 570), also known as John the Grammarian or John of Alexandria, was a Greek-speaking philologist, Aristotelian commentator and Christian theologian from Alexandria, Byzantine Egypt, who authored a number of philosophical treatises and theological works. John Philoponus broke from the Aristotelian–Neoplatonic tradition, questioning methodology and eventually leading to empiricism in the natural sciences. He was one of the first to propose a "theory of impetus" similar to the modern concept of inertia over Aristotelian dynamics. He is also the historical founder of what is now called the Kalam cosmological argument.

Later in life Philoponus turned to Christian apologetics, arguing against the eternity of the world in his De opificio mundi, a theory which formed the basis of pagan attacks on the Christian doctrine of Creation. He also wrote on Christology, espousing a miaphysite view. His by-name ὁ Φιλόπονος translates as "lover of toil", i.e. "diligent," referring to a miaphysite confraternity in Alexandria, the philoponoi, who were active in debating pagan (i.e. Neoplatonic) philosophers.

His posthumous condemnation limited the spread of his writing, but copies of his work, Contra Aristotelem, resurfaced in medieval Europe, through translations from Arabic of his quotes included in the work of Simplicius of Cilicia, which was debated in length by Muslim philosophers such as al-Farabi, Avicenna, al-Ghazali and later Averroes, influencing Bonaventure and Buridan in Christian Western Europe, but also Rabbanite Jews such as Maimonides and Gersonides, who also used his arguments against their Karaite rivals. His work was largely debated in the Arabic scholarly tradition, where he is known as Yaḥyā al-Naḥwī (i.e. "John the Grammarian"), and his views against Aristotelian physics were defended by philosophers at the court of Fatimid Imam Al-Hakim bi-Amr Allah, particularly Hamid al-Din al-Kirmani, who debated Avicenna on the topic, and Hamza ibn Ali. His critique of Aristotle in the Physics commentary was a major influence on Giovanni Pico della Mirandola and Galileo Galilei, who cited Philoponus substantially in his works.

== Life ==
Although John Philoponus possibly came from a Christian family, nothing is known of his early life. He studied at the school of Alexandria and began publishing from about 510. He was a pupil and sometime amanuensis to the Neoplatonic philosopher Ammonius Hermiae, who had studied at Athens under Proclus.

According to historian Leslie S. B. Maccoull:

Philoponus, a committed Egyptian Miaphysite, chose particular philosophical texts and problems as objects of his work because they were the material of current Miaphysite debate. His intention was to provide the nascent Coptic church with a powerful set of tools for argument, with which Egyptian Miaphysites could defeat their Chalcedonian opponents.

Philoponus's early writings are based on lectures given by Ammonius, but gradually he established his own independent thinking in his commentaries and critiques of Aristotle's On the Soul and Physics. In the latter work Philoponus became one of the earliest thinkers to reject Aristotle's dynamics and propose the "theory of impetus": i.e., an object moves and continues to move because of an energy imparted in it by the mover and ceases the movement when that energy is exhausted. This insightful theory was the first step towards the concept of inertia in modern physics, preceding Galileo Galilei's supposed supposed experiment at the Leaning Tower of Pisa by centuries. However, his theory was largely ignored at the time because he was too radical in his rejection of Aristotle:

But this [view of Aristotle] is completely erroneous, and our view may be completely corroborated by actual observation more effectively than by any sort of verbal argument. For if you let fall from the same height two weights, one many times heavier than the other you will see that the ratio of the times required for the motion does not depend [solely] on the weights, but that the difference in time is very small. ... — John Philoponus' refutation of the Aristotelian claim that the elapsed time for a falling body is inversely proportional to its weight

Philoponus is the only writer of antiquity to have formally presented such a concept. As the discovery of the principle of inertia is the hallmark achievement of modern science as it emerges in the 16th to 17th centuries, Pierre Duhem argues that its invention would put Philoponus among the "great geniuses of Antiquity" and the "principal precursors to modern science", although he holds it more likely that Philoponus may have received the idea from an earlier, otherwise unrecorded Alexandrian school of mechanics.

We must note that Aristotle himself observes in his Physica (Book IV, Part 8), that "why a thing once set in motion should stop anywhere; for why should it stop here rather than here? So that a thing will either be at rest or must be moved ad infinitum, unless something more powerful get in its way", a very good description of the concept of inertia in vacuum. He does, however, proceed to dismiss this idea on the grounds that a vacuum cannot exist.

In 529 Philoponus wrote his critique On the Eternity of the World Against Proclus in which he systematically defeats every argument put forward for the eternity of the world, a theory which formed the basis of pagan attack of the Christian doctrine of Creation. The intellectual battle against eternalism became one of Philoponus's major preoccupations and dominated several of his publications (some now lost) over the following decade.

He introduced a new period of scientific thought based heavily on three premises: (1) The universe is a product of one single God, (2) the heavens and the earth have the same physical properties, (3) and the stars are not divine. With these principles Philoponus went after his rival, Simplicius of Cilicia, by questioning Aristotle's' view of dynamics and cosmology. He argued that motion can occur in a void and that the velocity of a falling object is not based on its weight. He also held that God created all matter with its physical properties and with natural laws that would allow matter to progress from a state of chaos to an organized state forming the present universe. What remains of his writings indicate that he used the same didactic methods of reasoning that modern science uses and that he performed genuine experiments.

The style of his commentaries and his conclusions made Philoponus unpopular with his colleagues and fellow philosophers, and he appears to have ceased his study of philosophy around 530, devoting himself to theology instead. Around 550 he wrote a theological work On the Creation of the World as a commentary on the Bible’s creation account, using the insights of Greek philosophers and Basil of Caesarea. In this work he transfers his theory of impetus to the motion of the planets, whereas Aristotle had proposed different explanations for the motion of heavenly bodies and for earthly projectiles. Thus, Philoponus's theological work is recognized in the history of science as the first attempt at a unified theory of dynamics. Another of his major theological concerns was to argue that all material objects were brought into being by God (Arbiter, 52A–B).

Around 553 John Philoponus made some theological contributions to the Second Council of Constantinople concerning Christology through his Christological opus magnum, Arbiter. His miaphysite position drew upon Cyril of Alexandria, a point of reference to both miaphysite and Chalcedonian positions, and the miaphysite theologian Severus of Antioch but explicitly contradicted the position of the Cappadocian Fathers and their "rejection of particular natures". As a result, his position was posthumously condemned as "Tritheist" at the Third Council of Constantinople in 680/681.

== Legacy ==
John Philoponus's condemnation as a heretic limited the spread of his ideas in the following centuries, but in his own time and afterwards he was translated into Syriac and Arabic, and many of his works survived and were studied by the Arabs. Some of his works continued to circulate in Europe in Greek or Latin versions and influenced Bonaventure. The theory of impetus was taken up by Buridan in the 14th century.

Philoponus and his contemporaries, Simplicius of Cilicia and Strato developed the Aristotelian concept of space further, eventually influencing the Renaissance theory of perspective, particularly the one highlighted by Leon Battista Alberti, and other architectural masters.

== Works ==
=== Philosophical commentaries ===
The commentaries of the late antiquity and early Middle Ages aimed to teach an audience. In that regard, the repetitive nature of Philoponus’s commentaries demonstrates his pedagogical awareness. Although abstract in manner, Philoponus is chiefly focused on the concept in question.

Most of Philoponus’s early philosophical works strive to define the distinction between matter, extension, place, and various kinds of change. For example, the commentary On the Eternity of the World against Aristotle represents a standardized description of Aristotelian natural philosophy. Both Aristotle and Philoponus argue that in kinds of change there are differences, in their form and matter.

In Physics, Aristotle operates with the idea of places, but dismisses the existence of space. The idea that came from Plato and was developed by Aristotle has been evolved by Philoponus. Philoponus attempts to combine the idea of homogeneous space with the Aristotelian system. The argument made by Philoponus is that substances by themselves require some determinate quantity for their being. Similarly to Aristotle, who rejected the immaterial things, and in contrast to Plato who accepted immaterial substances in his metaphysics, Philoponus’s concept of substance refers to the material objects.

Concerning the discussion of space, Philoponus’s claim that from every point in space is possible to draw identical figures, made him be perceived as an innovative thinker who influenced later Renaissance scholars, for instance, Gianfranceso Pico della Mirandola and Galileo Galilei. Thus, Philoponus's idea of perspective signifies the concept of space as immaterial three-dimensional medium in which objects are located.

In the third book of De Anima, entitled De Intellectu, Philoponus analyzes the doctrine of the intellect. The author (Philoponus or pseudo-Philoponus?) sets the theory on the role and functioning of the active intellect. On one hand, there is the active intellect, and on the other, the idea of perception awareness or how we are aware that we are perceiving. In other words, in this reflective philosophy, there is a rationalist conclusion which emphasizes a relation between self and truth which leads to the discussion of the nature of knowledge.

According to this view, the knowledge is identical to its object, since the self-awareness of perception is divorced from the irrational soul. Therefore, the understanding arises through the identification of the intellect and its object. More specifically, perception deals only with material things.

Philoponus has raised the central question of the scientific and philosophical Aristotle's work on chemistry. The work called On Generation and Corruption examines the question of how is the mixture (chemical combination) possible? Philoponus’s contribution to the topic is in his new definition of potential, the third of the seven elements criteria. There are various interpretations of the theory of mixture, but it seems that Philoponus is rather refining Aristotle's approach than rejecting it. One of interpreters of Philophonus’ work on the theory of mixture, De Haas, implies that "no element can possess a quality essential to it except to a superlative extent".

=== Theological treatises ===
Philoponus’s major Christological work is Arbiter. The work was written shortly before the Second Council of Constantinople of 553. It became famous in regard to its doctrine on resurrection. Similarly to ideas presented in Physics, Philoponus in Arbiter states that our corrupted bodies (material things) will be eventually brought into being (matter and form) by God.

=== List of works ===
John Philoponus wrote at least 40 works on a wide array of subjects including grammar, mathematics, physics, chemistry, and theology. Some of these include:

- On words with different meanings in virtue of a difference of accent (De vocabulis quae diversum significatum exhibent secundum differentiam accentus)
- Commentary on Aristotle's On Generation and Corruption
- Commentary on Aristotle's De Anima
- Commentary on Aristotle's Categories
- Commentary on Aristotle's Prior Analytics
- Commentary on Aristotle's Posterior Analytics
- Commentary on Aristotle's Physics – In which he challenges Aristotle on time, space, void, matter and dynamics.
- Commentary on Aristotle's Meteorology
- Commentary on Nicomachus' Introduction to Arithmetic
- On the Eternity of the World against Proclus (De aeternitate mundi contra Proclum)
- On the Eternity of the World against Aristotle (De aeternitate mundi contra Aristotelem) – A refutation of Aristotle's doctrines of the fifth element and the eternity of motion and time, consisting of at least eight books.
- On the Creation of the World (De opificio mundi) – A theological-philosophical commentary on the Creation story in the Book of Genesis.
- On the Contingency of the World (De contingentia mundi)
- On the Use and Construction of the Astrolabe – The oldest extant Greek treatise on the astrolabe.
- Arbiter (Διαιτητής [Diaitêtês]) – A philosophical justification of miaphysitism. Not extant in Greek; Syriac text with Latin translation.
- On the Trinity (De trinitate) – The main source for a reconstruction of Philoponus's trinitarian doctrine.

== See also ==
- Byzantine science
