= Stratas =

Stratas is a surname. Notable people with this surname include:

- David Stratas (born 1960), Canadian jurist
- Diane Stratas (1932–2023), Canadian politician and businesswoman
- Teresa Stratas (born 1938), Canadian soprano of Greek descent
