= Aspasius =

2nd-century Greek philosopher and author

Aspasius (/æˈspeɪʒiəs, æˈspeɪziəs, æˈspeɪʒəs/; Ancient Greek: Ἀσπάσιος; c. 80 – c. 150 AD) was a Peripatetic philosopher. Boethius, who frequently referred to his works, said he wrote commentaries on most of the works of Aristotle.

The following commentaries are expressly mentioned: on De Interpretatione, the Physica, Metaphysica, Categoriae, and the Nicomachean Ethics. A portion of the commentary on the Nicomachean Ethics (books 1, 2, 4, 7, and 8) is extant. The Greek text of this commentary was published as Commentaria in Aristotelem Graeca (CAG) vol. 19.1, and David Konstan published an English translation. It is the earliest extant commentary on any of Aristotle's works. Porphyry told that Aspasius wrote commentaries on Plato, and that his Aristotelian works were used in Plotinus' school.

Albert the Great, in his commentary on Aristotle's Politics, wrote that a monograph on natural affections (Libellus de naturalibus passionibus) was written by Aspasius.
