= Michael of Ephesus =

- Born: c. 1050
- Died: 1129
- Scientific career
- Fields: Logic
- Workplaces: University of Constantinople
- Academic advisors: Eustratius of Nicaea

Michael of Ephesus or Michael Ephesius (Ancient Greek: Μιχαὴλ ὁ Ἐφέσιος; c. 1050 – 1129) was a Byzantine scholar. He wrote important commentaries on Aristotle, including the first full commentary on the Sophistical Refutations, which established the regular study of that text.

== Life ==
Little is known about Michael's life. It is known that he worked in the philosophy college of the University of Constantinople. Together with Eustratius of Nicaea, he was part of a circle organized by Anna Comnena. As Michael suggests at the end of his Parva Naturalia commentary, his goal was to provide coverage of texts in the Corpus Aristotelicum that had been neglected by earlier commentators; this was "part of a cooperative scholarly undertaking conceived and guided by Anna Comnena."

The fanciful suggestion that the Aristotelian commentator was none other than Michael VII Doukas, making good on his tuition under Michael Psellos (who was apparently not Michael of Ephesus' teacher) and turning after his abdication to scholarship as the archbishop of Ephesus, is no longer taken seriously.

== Work ==
Michael's breadth is remarkable, and his interpretive method has been compared to that of Alexander of Aphrodisias; the commentary on Metaphysics Books 7–14 attributed to Alexander is considered to be his work. Michael's commentaries draw on Neoplatonist ideas and on the exegetical tradition of Stephen of Alexandria. At times they allude to contemporary Byzantine matters and include criticism of the emperor and of the current state of education.

== Works ==
=== The commentaries: Greek texts ===
- On Sophistical Refutations: Commentaria in Aristotelem Graeca II.3
- On Generation of Animals: CAG XIV.3
- On Nicomachean Ethics, books 9-10: CAG XX
- On Parva Naturalia: CAG XXII.1
- On Parts of Animals, Movement of Animals, Progression of Animals: CAG XXII.2
- On Nicomachean Ethics, book 5: CAG XXII.3
- Michael's commentary on the pseudo-Aristotelian On Colors remains unedited, and his commentary on Politics survives only in part.

=== Latin translations ===
James of Venice may have collected texts from Michael's workshop for translation into Latin. The composite collection of commentaries including Michael's commentaries on the Nicomachean Ethics was translated into Latin by Robert Grosseteste, and again by Giovanni Bernardo Feliciano (Venice 1541).

=== English translations ===
- Aristotle and Michael of Ephesus on the Movement and Progression of Animals, trans. Anthony Preus, Hildesheim: Georg Olms, 1981. ISBN 978-3487070735.
- Aspasius, Anonymous, Michael of Ephesus, On Aristotle: Nicomachean Ethics 8 and 9, trans. David Konstan, Duckworth, 2001. ISBN 978-1780939100.
- Ephesus, Michael of; Themistios (2020). On Aristotle: Nicomachean Ethics 10. Translated by Wilberding, James; Trompeter, Julia; Rigolio, Alberto. New York: Bloomsbury Academic. ISBN 978-1350170919. OCLC 1353217951. 276 pages.
