= Eustratius of Nicaea =

- Born: c. 1050/1060
- Died: c. 1120
- Scientific career
- Fields: Logic
- Workplaces: University of Constantinople
- Academic advisors: John Italus
- Notable students: Michael of Ephesus

Eustratius of Nicaea (Greek: Εὐστράτιος; c. 1050/1060 – c. 1120) was a Byzantine scholar and metropolitan bishop of Nicaea. He wrote commentaries on Aristotle's second book of the Analytica Posteriora and the Ethica Nicomachea.

== Biography ==
Eustratius was a pupil of John Italus, although he had deliberately dissociated himself from John's supposed heretical views when John was condemned around 1082. A few years after the trial of Italus, he wrote a dialogue and treatise on the use of icons directed against Leo, the bishop of Chalcedon, who had accused the emperor Alexios I Komnenos of sacrilege and iconoclasm in the way in which he had stripped the churches of gold to fund his wars. For this he gained the emperor Alexios I's friendship, and this probably helped him to become metropolitan bishop of Nicaea. Eustratius was said by Anna Comnena to have been wise both in mundane and in religious matters and especially expert in argument. Nevertheless he found himself accused of heresy in 1117 and a charge was placed before the Synod of Constantinople which narrowly succeeded despite a defence by Patriarch John IX of Constantinople. As a result of the condemnation Eustratius was formally suspended for life and only rehabilitated after his death.

Two commentaries by Eustratius on the works of Aristotle survive:

- Commentary on the Posterior Analytics, book 2
- Commentary on the Nicomachean Ethics, books 1 and 6, found in vol. 20 of Commentaria in Aristotelem Graeca (CAG).
