= Dexippus (philosopher) =

Ancient Greek Neoplatonist philosopher

Dexippus (Greek: Δέξιππος; fl. 350) was a Greek Neoplatonic philosopher from the 4th century AD, who wrote a commentary on the Categories of Aristotle which is partially extant.

Dexippus was likely a pupil of the Neoplatonist Iamblichus, but little else in known about his life. Like many other Neoplatonists, Dexippus advocated harmony between the philosophies of Plato and Aristotle. In his work, Dexippus explains the categories to a student named Seleucus, and endeavors at the same time to refute the objections of Plotinus. His work was known to the later Neoplatonist Simplicius of Cilicia, who mentions his commentary in his own work on the categories.

== Life ==
Very little is known about Dexippus' life. He was likely a student of the more famous Neoplatonist Iamblichus, who wrote a philosophical letter addressed to Dexippus explaining dialectics, a fragment of which has been preserved by Stobaeus.

== Commentary on Aristotle's Categories ==
The only known work by Dexippus is his commentary on Aristotle's Categories. It is written in the form of a dialogue between the author and his young pupil Seleucus, with the pupil posing the problems and the teacher solving them. The first two books have survived in a complete form, while the third is only partially extant. The first book contains 40 chapters, each devoted to a problem, the second 42. Of the 40 chapters of the third book, the first ten have survived in full, of the remaining thirty only the headings are available, which are probably not authentic. If the work dealt with the entire theory of categories, its size must originally have been several times that of the surviving text.

At the beginning, Dexippus points out that he does not want to venture into new philosophical territory with his own findings and compete with earlier commentators. Rather, he contented himself with clarifying a number of controversially discussed questions. In his answers, he relies heavily on the commentaries on the Categories written by Porphyry and Iamblichus, both of which are lost except for fragments. Due to the loss of these commentaries, the work of Dexippus, despite its low originality, has a relatively high value as a source of the historical philosophy of these thinkers. In the second and third books, Dexippus deals with Plotinus's objections to Aristotle's theory of categories. In doing so, he not only deals with arguments that can be found in Plotinus' Enneads, but also with considerations that Porphyry, as a pupil of Plotinus, probably knew from his oral lessons and used in his lost commentary.

In his commentary, in addition to explaining the Categories and clarifying ambiguities, Dexippus also discusses difficult issues. Dexippus intended to show that Platonic and Aristotelian ideas can be reconciled. He is particularly interested in the central question of the ontological status of the categories from a Neoplatonic point of view. In doing so, he represents the current position of the Neoplatonists, according to which the classification of categories is not suitable for capturing things in themselves, but is an adequate means of classifying perceptible phenomena. Porphyry had defended the theory of categories against Plotinus's objections in his large commentary on Categories, which has not survived, while Dexippus' teacher Iamblichus had also emphatically advocated it. Dexippus shared this view, which prevailed in late antique Neoplatonism, but while Iamblichus tried to refute Plotinus' arguments against the doctrine of categories, Dexippus endeavored to demonstrate that the positions of Plotinus and Aristotle are not so far apart as Plotinus' anti-Aristotelian arguments might suggest.

== Legacy ==
In the early 6th century, the work of Dexippus was still known in the Neoplatonic philosophical school of Athens, where it was available to Simplicius of Cilicia, who mentions it in his own work on the Categories. Unlike modern manuscripts, Simplicius probably had access to a manuscript containing the full text. However, he hardly paid attention to this source; presumably he did not use it at all because he was of the opinion that Dexippus added little new to Categories commentaries of Porphyry and Iamblichus.

In the Latin-speaking scholarly world of the Middle Ages, Dexippus was unknown. However, in the Renaissance, the humanist Johannes Bernardus Felicianus, who translated a number of ancient Greek writings into Latin in the first half of the 16th century, made a Latin translation of Dexippus' Categories commentary printed in Venice in 1546 and in Paris in 1549. Leonhard von Spengel published the first edition of the Greek text in 1859. An English translation by John M. Dillon was published in 1990.

== Sources ==
- Dillon, John M. (1990). Dexippus: On Aristotle Categories. Duckworth.
