= Posterior Analytics =

Scientific work by Aristotle

The Posterior Analytics (Ancient Greek: Ἀναλυτικὰ Ὕστερα; Latin: Analytica Posteriora) is a text from Aristotle's Organon that deals with demonstration, definition, and scientific knowledge. The demonstration is distinguished as a syllogism productive of scientific knowledge, while the definition marked as the statement of a thing's nature, ... a statement of the meaning of the name, or of an equivalent nominal formula.

== Content ==
In the Prior Analytics, syllogistic logic is considered in its formal aspect; in the Posterior it is considered in respect of its matter. The "form" of a syllogism lies in the necessary connection between the premises and the conclusion. Even where there is no fault in the form, there may be in the matter, i.e. the propositions of which it is composed, which may be true or false, probable or improbable.

When the premises are certain, true, and primary, and the conclusion formally follows from them, this is demonstration, and produces scientific knowledge of a thing. Such syllogisms are called apodeictical, and are dealt with in the two books of the Posterior Analytics. When the premises are not certain, such a syllogism is called dialectical, and these are dealt with in the eight books of the Topics. A syllogism which seems to be perfect both in matter and form, but which is not, is called sophistical, and these are dealt with in the book On Sophistical Refutations.

The contents of the Posterior Analytics may be summarised as follows:

- All demonstration must be founded on principles already known. The principles on which it is founded must either themselves be demonstrable, or be so-called first principles, which cannot be demonstrated, nor need to be, being evident in themselves ("nota per se").
- We cannot demonstrate things in a circular way, supporting the conclusion by the premises, and the premises by the conclusion. Nor can there be an infinite number of middle terms between the first principle and the conclusion.
- In all demonstration, the first principles, the conclusion, and all the intermediate propositions, must be necessary, general and eternal truths. Of things that happen by chance, or contingently, or which can change, or of individual things, there is no demonstration.
- Some demonstrations prove only that the things are a certain way, rather than why they are so. The latter are the most perfect.
- The first figure of the syllogism (see term logic for an outline of syllogistic theory) is best adapted to demonstration, because it affords conclusions universally affirmative. This figure is commonly used by mathematicians.
- The demonstration of an affirmative proposition is preferable to that of a negative; the demonstration of a universal to that of a particular; and direct demonstration to a reductio ad absurdum.
- The principles are more certain than the conclusion.
- There cannot be both opinion and knowledge of the same thing at the same time.

In the second book, Aristotle starts with a remarkable statement, the kinds of things determine the kinds of questions, which are four:

1. Whether the relation of a property (attribute) with a thing is a true fact (τὸ ὅτι).
2. What is the reason of this connection (τὸ διότι).
3. Whether a thing exists (εἰ ἔστι).
4. What is the nature and meaning of the thing (τί ἐστιν).

Or in a more literal translation (Owen): 1. that a thing is, 2. why it is, 3. if it is, 4. what it is.

The last of these questions was called by Aristotle, in Greek, the "what it is" of a thing. Scholastic logicians translated this into Latin as "quiddity" (quidditas). This quiddity cannot be demonstrated, but must be fixed by a definition. He deals with definition, and how a correct definition should be made. As an example, he gives a definition of the number three, defining it to be the first odd prime number.

Maintaining that "to know a thing's nature is to know the reason why it is" and "we possess scientific knowledge of a thing only when we know its cause", Aristotle posited four major sorts of cause as the most sought-after middle terms of demonstration: the definable form; an antecedent which necessitates a consequent; the efficient cause; the final cause.

He concludes the book with the way the human mind comes to know the basic truths or primary premises or first principles, which are not innate, because people may be ignorant of them for much of their lives. Nor can they be deduced from any previous knowledge, or they would not be first principles. He states that first principles are derived by induction, from the sense-perception implanting the true universals in the human mind. From this idea comes the scholastic maxim "there is nothing in the understanding which was not prior in the senses".

Of all types of thinking, scientific knowing and intuition are considered as only universally true, where the latter is the originative source of scientific knowledge.
