= Common sense (disambiguation) =

Common sense is a basic level of knowledge and judgment shared by nearly all people Common sense may also refer to:

== History of ideas ==
- Scottish common sense realism, a school of philosophy
- Sensus communis, a historical understanding of sense perceptions

== Print media ==
- Common Sense, a 1775–76 tract on American independence by Thomas Paine
- Common Sense (book series), a 1960s series of political books published in the UK by Victor Gollancz
- Common Sense (Benn and Hood book), a 1993 book by Tony Benn and Andrew Hood
- Common Sense (American magazine), an American political magazine 1932–1946
- Common Sense (Scottish magazine), a magazine of left-wing theory 1987–1999
- Common Sense (newspaper), a far-right newspaper
- Common Sense: A Political History, 2011 book by Sophia Rosenfeld
- Common Sense, a 1941 novella by Robert A. Heinlein, half of the 1963 novel Orphans of the Sky
- Glenn Beck's Common Sense, a 2009 book

== Music ==
- Common (rapper), formerly Common Sense
- Common Sense (band), an American reggae group
- Common Sense (J Hus album), 2017
- Common Sense (John Prine album), 1975
- Common Sense, an album by Joel Cummins, 2001
- "Common Sense", a song by Wilco from Schmilco

== Artificial intelligence ==
- Commonsense knowledge (artificial intelligence)
- Commonsense reasoning

== Other uses ==
- Common Sense (animation studio), a Japanese animation studio
- Common Sense (podcast), an American history podcast by Dan Carlin
- Common Sense Media, a San Francisco-based non-profit organization

== See also ==
- Common Sense Party (disambiguation)
