= Funding4Learning =

Crowdfunding platform

- Website type: Crowdfunding
- Available in: English
- Website: http://www.funding4learning.com
- Commercial: Yes
- Launched: May 2011

Funding4Learning is a "human capital oriented" crowd funding platform for educational projects. Funding4Learning provides its users with fundraising tools for study, volunteering, as well as a diverse array of education related initiatives.

== Concept ==
Funding4Learning, as other "crowdfunding dubbed" platforms, allows users to create a fundraising page for their funding initiative, offer "rewards" in accordance with different levels of contributions, and start a social media-based publicity and word of mouth effort.

Unlike similar sites such as Kickstarter or Indiegogo, Funding4Learning is a specialized crowdfunding site that dedicates entirely to education related projects.

Funding4Learning uses PayPal as their main provider for all the fundraising payment's processing and transaction services.

== Model ==
Funding4Learning works with an "all or nothing" approach, which means that the collected funds are disbursed only if the fundraising campaign is successful. However, a contributor is allowed to make a "direct contribution", which is guaranteed to be paid whether or not the campaign is successful. Funding4Learning charges 5% of funds disbursed from a successful campaign, and 5% of all direct contributions.

While there is no guarantee that users that post campaigns on Funding4Learning will undertake the educational program presented on their campaigns or deliver on their promise of a reward, Funding4Learning asks its users to post their resumes on their campaign website and advises donors to use their own judgment when supporting a campaign.

== See also ==
- Comparison of crowd funding services
