= Sensus communis =

Mental faculty which interprets the senses

The Sensus communis, or Common sense (Ancient Greek koinḕ aísthēsis), is the animal soul's proposed "inner sense" which perceives reality by monitoring and coordinating the five "external senses" (sight, hearing, taste, smell and touch).

The term Common Sense was first used this way by Aristotle, who was working through a problem which had previously been laid out by his teacher Plato, and explained instead by positing a level of conscious thought in animals. Aristotle's new explanation led to the creation of the new technical term "Common Sense", and a widely accepted hypothesis which lasted centuries in classical and medieval natural philosophy, and was translated and refined by Greek, Roman, Arabic and Christian authors.

While Aristotle originally believed that the Common Sense existed in the heart, it was later localized by Galen—together with imagination, cogitation, and memory—in the fluid-filled ventricles of the brain, a scheme known as the cell doctrine (Zellenlehre).

Later philosophers developing Aristotle's line of thought, such as Themistius, Galen, and Al-Farabi, calling it the ruler of the senses or ruling sense, apparently a metaphor developed from a section of Plato's Timaeus (70b). Augustine and some of the Arab writers, also called it the "inner sense".

The concept of the inner senses, plural, was further developed in the Middle Ages. Under the influence of the great Persian philosophers Al-Farabi and Avicenna, several inner senses came to be listed. Thomas Aquinas and John of Jandun recognized four internal senses: the common sense, imagination, vis cogitativa, and memory. Avicenna, followed by Robert Grosseteste, Albert the Great, and Roger Bacon, argued for five internal senses: the common sense, imagination, fantasy, vis aestimativa, and memory." The "cogitative" or "estimative" capacity, vis aestimativa, "enables the animal to extract vital information about its environment from the form processed by the common sense and imagination".

By the time of Descartes and Hobbes, in the 1600s, the inner senses had been standardized to five wits, which complemented the more well-known five "external" senses. Under this medieval scheme the common sense was still understood to be seated not in the heart, as Aristotle had thought, but in the anterior Galenic ventricle of the brain. However, the anatomist Andreas Vesalius found no connections between the anterior ventricle and the sensory nerves, leading to speculation about other parts of the brain into the 1600s, and Descartes.

== Aristotelian philosophy ==
Aristotle, the first person known to have discussed "common sense"

The origin of the term "common sense" (Latin: Sensus communis, Ancient Greek: koinḕ aísthēsis) is in the works of Aristotle, but the ways in which he used the term were very different to the one most common in modern English. Although his model of perception is no longer commonly accepted, it has been called "one of the most successful and resilient of Aristotelian notions". In their own different ways, "the philosophers of medieval Latin and Arabic tradition, from Al-Farabi to Avicenna, Averroës, Albert, and Thomas, found in the De Anima and the Parva Naturalia the scattered elements of a coherent doctrine of the "central" faculty of the sensuous soul."

=== Plato as predecessor ===
Aristotle's most well-known reference to the common sense addressed a problem posed by his older friend and teacher Plato in his Socratic dialogue, the Theaetetus, in which Plato already used the Greek term tá koiná (τά κοινᾰ́, the "common" or "shared") to refer to what is common or shared in different sense perceptions—in the same way Aristotle later did. Plato described his own teacher Socrates arguing that knowledge can't be a result of sense perception on its own, because the soul (psūkhḗ) clearly doesn't use any sense organ to grasp what connects the different sensations it receives from the different sense organs. The senses on their own can't therefore account for the way in which the soul identifies real things, from diverse sense perceptions. The soul must therefore have its own ability to grasp the things which different sensations have in common—tá koiná—such as whether two particular sensory perceptions are connected to real things that are similar, identical, plural, or the same. Instead, Plato's Socrates convinces his interlocutor that "there is no special bodily organ for these things" and "the soul itself, through itself [αὐτὴ δι᾽ αὑτῆς ἡ ψυχὴ] investigates the common features (tá koiná) of all things".

The koiná in Plato and Aristotle are similar to what Robert Boyle and John Locke referred to as "primary qualities". Scholars debate whether Plato saw the koiná as being identical to his proposed "forms".

Aristotle however clearly distinguished the koiná perceived by the common sense, from the forms or ideas seen by the intellect or noûs).

According to Gregorić, Plato's Socrates differs from Aristotle because he makes perception of these common things a kind of thinking, and not a kind of sense. Plato also indicated that it was not restricted to humans. In contrast, Aristotle, similarly trying to give a general account of the souls of all animals, not just humans, moved the act of perception out of the rational thinking soul, which he believed was unique to humans, into this sensus communis, which is something like a sense, and something like thinking, but not rational.

Concerning the question of where the soul was in the body there had been a long debate among Greek physicians before the time of Plato and Aristotle, about whether this would be in the head or heart. Unlike Aristotle, Plato located it in the head.

=== Aristotle's explanation ===
The only text of Aristotle which is certainly about the topic that later became an important medieval technical term is Aristotle's De Anima Book III, chapter 1, especially at line 425a27, which runs back over the argument of Plato's Socrates. Other places in the works of Aristotle where he used the same two words together include On Memory I.450a, Parts of Animals IV.10 686a, Metaphysics I.1 981b, and History of Animals I.3 489a, but he was not necessarily using them to refer to the same concept which became medieval Sensus communis. This passage in De Anima is about how the animal mind converts raw sense perceptions from the five specialized "external" sense perceptions, into mental perceptions of real things moving and changing, which can be thought about. According to Aristotle's understanding of perception, each of the five senses perceives one type of "perceptible" or "sensible" which is not "common", but specific (idia, ἴδια) to itself. For example, sight can see colour. But Aristotle was explaining how the animal mind, not just the human mind, links and categorizes different tastes, colours, feelings, smells and sounds in order to perceive real things in terms of the "common sensibles" (or "common perceptibles"). In this discussion, "common" (koiné) is a term opposed to specific or particular (idia).

For Aristotle tá koiná, the common or shared things, include not only the oneness of each thing, but also its specific shape and size and so on, and the change or movement of each thing. Aristotle lists change, shape, magnitude, number and unity, but he notes that we perceive shape, magnitude, and the rest by first being able to perceive change or movement (Greek uses one word for both: κῑ́νησῐς, kī́nēsis), and number is perceived by perceiving a lack of unity.

Like Plato, Aristotle explained that concerning these koiná (such as movement) people have a sense within their soul, but he introduced a name for it— the "common sense" or sense of the common things (aísthēsis koinḕ). He added detail to the argument of Plato's interlocutors, saying that there is no specific (idéā) sense perception for movement and other koiná, because then we would not perceive the koiná at all, except by accident (κᾰτᾰ́ σῠμβεβηκός, katá sumbebēkós). Lee explains that "when I see Socrates, it is not insofar as he is Socrates that he is visible to my eye, but rather because he is coloured". So the normal five individual senses do sense the common perceptibles according to Aristotle (and Plato), but it is not something they can normally interpret correctly on their own. Aristotle proposes that the reason for having several senses is in fact that it increases the chances that we can distinguish and recognize things correctly, and not just occasionally or by accident. Each sense is used to identify distinctions, such as sight identifying the difference between black and white, but, says Aristotle, all animals with perception must have "some one thing" that can distinguish black from sweet. Plato, in his Theaetatus 185a–c uses the question of how to judge if sound or colour are salty. The common sense is where this comparison happens, and this must occur by comparing impressions (or symbols or markers; σημεῖον, sēmeîon, 'sign, mark') of what the specialist senses have perceived. The common sense is therefore also where a type of consciousness originates, "for it makes us aware of having sensations at all". And it receives physical picture imprints from the imaginative faculty, which are then memories that can be recollected.

Compared to Plato, Aristotle's understanding of the soul (psūkhḗ) has an extra level of complexity in the form of the noûs or "intellect"—which is something only humans have and enables humans to perceive things differently from other animals. It works with images coming from the common sense and imagination, using reasoning (lógos) as well as the active intellect, both of which are unique to humans. The noûs identifies the true forms of things, while the common sense identifies shared aspects of things. Though scholars have varying interpretations of the details, Aristotle's "common sense" was in any case not rational, in the sense that it implied no ability to explain the perception. Reason or rationality (lógos) exists only in man according to Aristotle, and yet some animals can perceive "common perceptibles" such as change and shape, and some even have imagination according to Aristotle. Animals with imagination come closest to having something like reasoning and noûs. Plato, on the other hand was apparently willing to allow that animals could have some level of real thought, meaning that he did not have to explain their sometimes complex behavior within a strict division between high-level perception processing and the human-like thinking such as being able to form opinions. Gregorić additionally argues that Aristotle can be interpreted as using the verbs phroneîn and noeîn to distinguish two types of thinking or awareness, the first being found in animals and the second unique to humans and involving reason. Therefore, in Aristotle (and the medieval Aristotelians) the universals used to identify and categorize things are divided into two. In medieval terminology these are the species sensibilis used for perception and imagination in animals, and the species intelligibilis or apprehendable forms used in the human intellect or noûs.

=== Variations in Aristotle ===
The passage in De Anima is difficult to interpret and there is little consensus about the details. Gregorić has argued that at least in some passages Aristotle did not use the term as a standardized technical term at all, and he argues that Aristotle used the term in several ways. Gregorić distinguishes four "notions" which Aristotle connected to the same combination of words:

- Aristotle sometimes uses the term to refer to individual sense perceptions, especially touch, simply because they are common in the sense of being widely shared, for example by most types of animals.
- According to Gregorić the medieval technical term Sensus communis is derived from the De Anima passage, and this passage describes an ability of each of the senses to perceive the common perceptibles. Gregorić calls this the "perceptual capacity of the soul" and notes that it is "only conceptually differentiated into the individual senses" so that it "can operate as this or that individual sense, but it can also operate as a unity". According to Gregorić, there appears to have been a standardization of the term koinḕ aísthēsis as a term for the perceptual capacity (not the higher level sensory capacity), which occurred after Aristotle, but by the time of Alexander of Aphrodisias at the latest.
- A third meaning in Aristotle is what Gregorić calls the "sensory capacity of the soul", which Aristotle himself used in three different places, perhaps as a technical term, involving discussion of memory and dreaming. Gregorić describes it as a single thing only conceptually differentiated from the perceptual capacity of the soul and the imaginative capacity of the soul.
- A fourth notion which Gregorić sees within the Aristotelian scheme is when this sensory capacity of the soul "can combine perception and imagination, and thus achieve feats of non-rational cognition manifest in some non-human animals". According to Gregorić, this is the concept which Aristotle called the prôton aisthētikón (lit. ''first of the senses''). In one such passage in On Memory Aristotle wrote that "an image [phantasma] is an affection of the common sense".

The categorization of Gregorić is an attempt to resolve problems in Aristotle's different uses of the term Common Sense. For example, there has long been a difficulty to determine whether the common sense is truly separable from the imaginative faculty (phantasíā), although the two clearly work together in animals, and not only humans, for example in order to enable a perception of time. They may even be the same.

=== Alexander of Aphrodisias ===
The 2nd-century Aristotelian Alexander of Aphrodisias influenced most later interpretations of Aristotle's Common Sense. Gregorić identifies five positions of his which became standard, whether or not they were identical to Aristotle's own understanding:

- He consistently defined Common Sense in a way which kept it distinct from imagination (phantasia), making it a "strictly perceptual capacity which is directed at operations of the lower-order perceptual capacities".
- He specified more clearly that people perceive themselves seeing and hearing "by means of the common sense, rather than by the special senses".
- He also specified that "the common sensibles are perceived by the common sense, rather than by the special senses", which is a position Gregorić understands as being different to Aristotle's, but more consistent and clear.
- He used an influential analogy of the common sense being the centre of a circle in which different radii meet. Gregorić calls this "a brilliant innovation that intuitively captured the Peripatetic cardiocentric model, leaving a deep impression on later students of Aristotle". In working out this analogy Alexander also argued that "an act of perception is not a case of material change", a new proposal which resolved a logical problem in Aristotle's explanation.

== Galen ==
Galen the Roman medical writer was a near contemporary of Alexander. The entire medieval edifice rested on Galen, whose ventricular-pneumatic physiology dominated neuroscience from antiquity to the end of the 17th century. In this scheme the πνεῦμα ψυχικόν dwelt in the ventricles and was distributed through the nerves to govern sensation and movement, the sensus communis being the first station at which the converging senses were received. Galen's account of the rete mirabile derived from dissection of the ox and pig, in which the vascular net exists, and was wrongly generalized to humans, in whom it does not—an error transmitted unexamined for more than a millennium.

The localization of the faculties in three cerebral ventricles—imagination in front, the intellective faculty in the middle, memory in the rear—derives from Galen (129–c. 199). It reached the Middle Ages through Nemesius of Emesa (De natura hominis, ch. 5) and John Damascene (De fide orthodoxa, chs. 32–34). Augustine (354–430) was the first to render Aristotle's common sense in Latin as sensus interior (Confessions I.17; vis interior, VII.27), though only in the singular.

In Galenic physiology, πνεῦμα ψυχικόν (psychic pneuma) was produced when blood was filtered through the rete mirabile, a vascular network present in ungulates such as the ox and pig—on which Galen dissected—but absent in humans.

== Avicenna ==
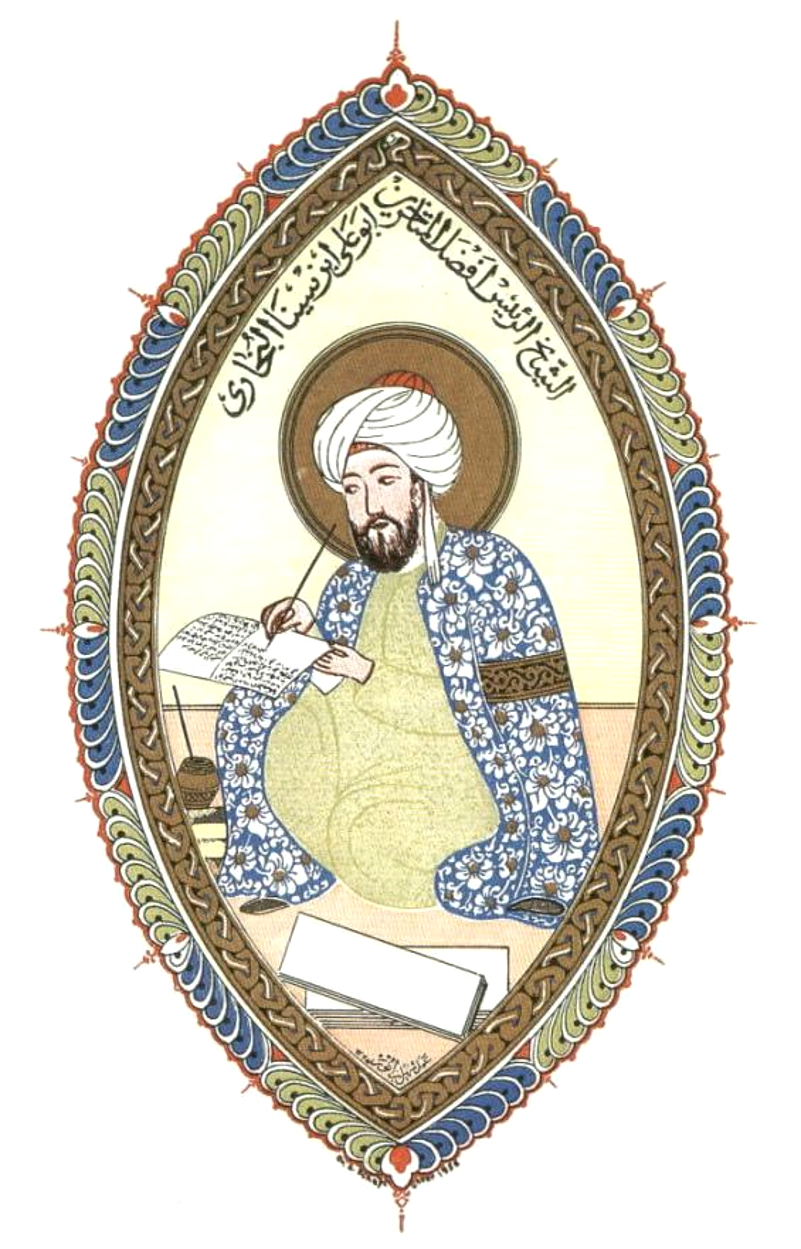
Avicenna became one of the greatest medieval authorities concerning Aristotelian common sense, both in Islamic and Christian lands.

In contrast to Alexander and Al-Farabi, Avicenna later emphasized the link between common sense and fantasy, and this influenced future authors including Christian philosophers.

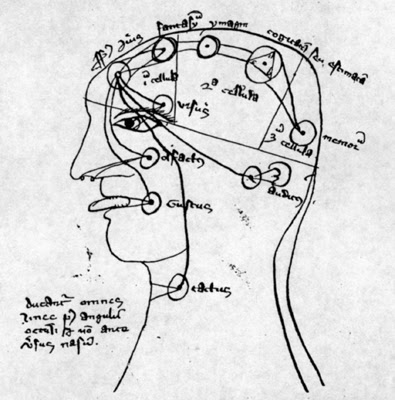
Latin manuscript (1347) illustrating Ibn Sīnā (Avicenna), De generatione embryonis. The cerebral ventricles are labeled sensus communis, fantasia, ymaginativa, and cogitativa seu estimativa; at the back of the head, memorativa. The three brain compartments are cellula 1, 2, and 3. Behind the eye, visus; below, olfactus, gustus, and tactus, by the ear auditus.

The plurality of inner senses was most influentially systematized by Avicenna (980–1037) in the Liber de anima (I.5). He listed five powers of the apprehensive soul: (1) the sensus communis, which combines the forms received from the five external senses; (2) the imaginatio, which stores them; (3) the vis imaginativa, which combines and separates stored forms; (4) the vis aestimativa, which judges what is salient (the sheep apprehending the wolf as something to flee); and (5) the vis memorialis, which retains these estimations. Avicenna placed the sensus communis in the forepart of the front ventricle of the brain. In the Latin translation of Avicenna's De anima, forms received through the common sense and stored in the phantasia were rendered as repraesentationes ("representations"), a usage that shaped later medieval theories of mental representation.

== Albertus Magnus ==
Albertus Magnus (c. 1200–1280) adopted Avicenna's classification and combined it with an account of the brain and the animal spirits drawn from Costa ben Luca's De differentia animae et spiritus in order to localize the inner senses (Summa de homine). For Albertus the classification reflects different levels of abstraction, corresponding to the grades of subtlety of the animal spirits.

The common sense "belongs to the same level of abstraction as the five external senses because its function depends on the immediate presence of a perceived object. Nonetheless, it is not counted as an external sense, because it does not receive its forms directly from the external object, but from the external senses."

In his Philosophia naturalis, Albertus allocated the faculties within the brain's cavities (concavitate cerebri): (I) common sense and basic imagination; (II) creative imagination (imaginativa), phantasy, rational thought (cogitatio), and evaluation (estimatio); (III) memory and reminiscence. A schematic illustration of the three cavities appeared in the posthumous 1506 edition, described as among the first such diagrams. (Note: The priority of this illustration is contested; cf. Clarke & Dewhurst, who trace earlier ventricular diagrams.")

== Thomas Aquinas ==
Thomas Aquinas (1225–1274) called the common sense the "root and principle" (radix et principium) of the external senses, because it joins their separate impressions into a unified episode of perceiving an object (Summa Theologiae Ia q. 78 a. 4). Following Averroes, Aquinas held that in human beings the animal vis aestimativa is replaced by the vis cogitativa (ratio particularis), which accounts for quasi-propositional perception. Aquinas counted four internal senses using the brain as their organ, noting that there had been considerable historical disagreement over their number.

== Late medieval anatomists ==
=== Leonardo da Vinci and ventricular localization ===
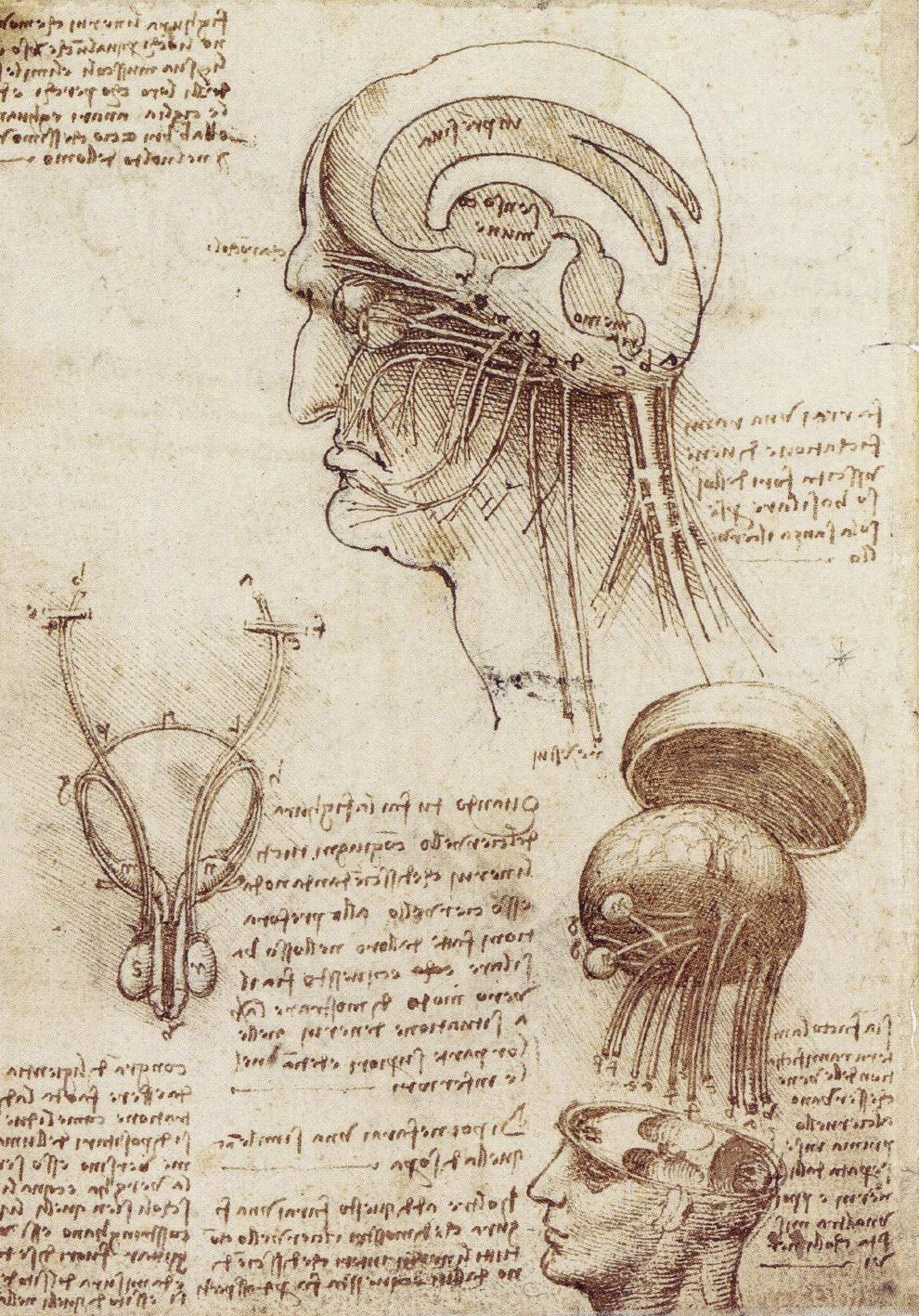
Leonardo da Vinci depicted the cerebral ventricles and labelled the middle ventricle senso comune, his Italian rendering of sensus communis, showing the optic, olfactory, and auditory nerves entering the ventricular system.

Leonardo da Vinci (1452–1519), in his anatomical studies of c. 1489–1508, depicted the cerebral ventricles and labelled the middle ventricle senso comune, his Italian rendering of sensus communis, showing the optic, olfactory, and auditory nerves entering the ventricular system. His drawings, based increasingly on his own observation, represent the cell doctrine even as he sought a physical basis for the faculties.

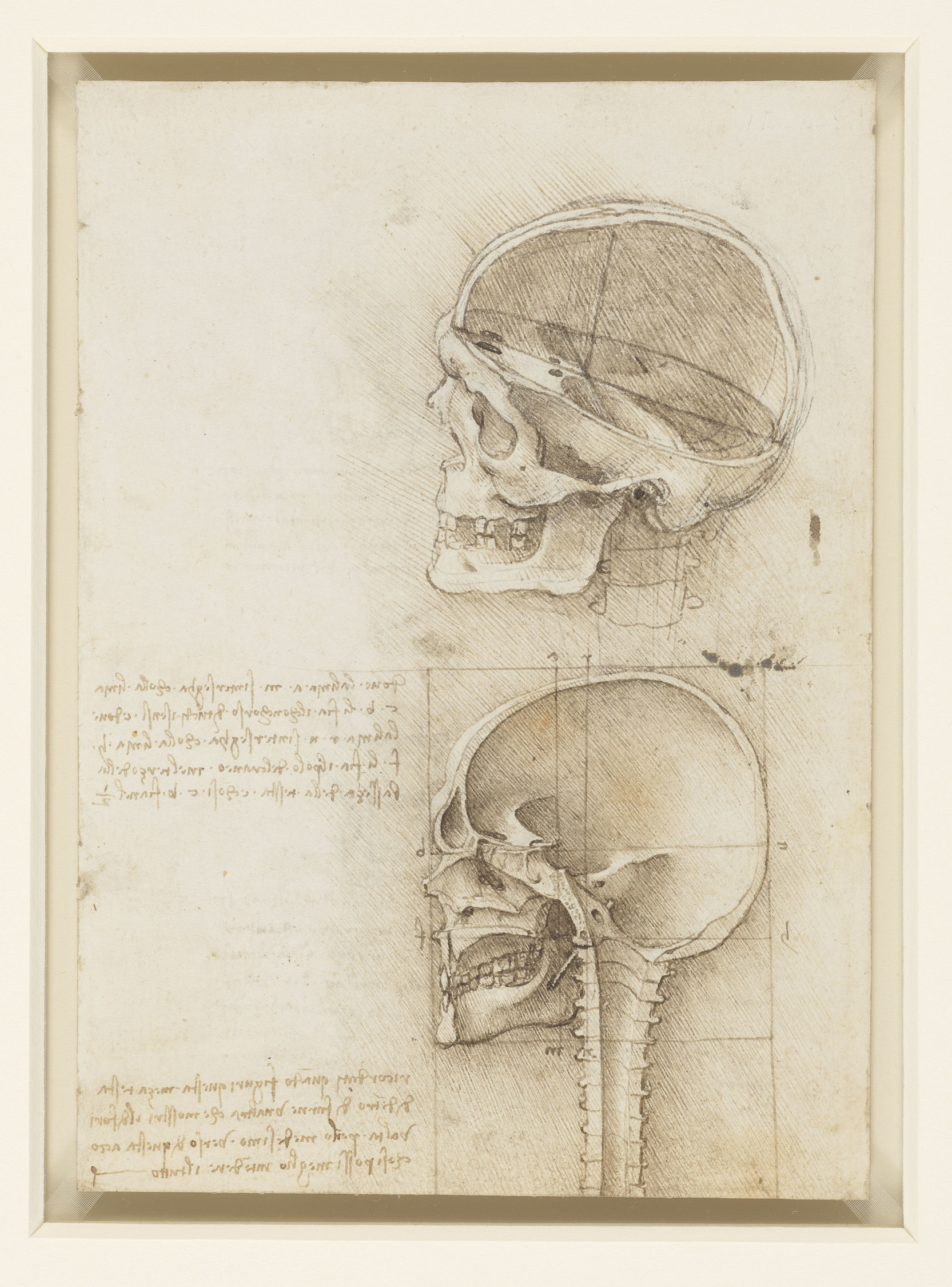
Leonardo da Vinci located the senso comune at the intersection of axes drawn through the cranium.

=== Variants and the Renaissance critique ===
The schemes were never uniform: some manuscripts depict four cells, others three. The 1496 Philosophia pauperum shows three, treating the middle not as a true ventricle but as a passage between anterior and posterior.

A different challenge came from humanist philology. Lorenzo Valla (c. 1406–1457), in his Repastinatio dialectice et philosophie, rejected the Aristotelian sensus communis outright—mentioning the faculty "only to be rejected without further argument"—and let memory absorb the functions the scholastics had divided among separate sensory faculties. Valla measured the scholastic apparatus against "common linguistic usage" and ordinary common sense, treating the localized inner faculty as a category mistake. The episode marks a turn in which the technical inner sense was challenged in the name of the vernacular meaning of "common sense."

=== Late-medieval anatomy: Mondino ===
From the early 14th century, under the influence of Mondino de Luzzi's Anothomia, the structures of the anterior ventricles began to be read against direct dissection rather than received authority; the "worm" of the older texts was reinterpreted as the choroid plexus, and its Galenic heritage abandoned. Human dissection reappeared in this period after its long suspension.

=== The Renaissance anatomists: Berengario and Vesalius ===
Jacopo Berengario da Carpi (c. 1460–1530) illustrated the ventricular system as visualized by wax injection in the ox, and depicted the base of the human brain partly covered by "a spidery structure corresponding to the rete mirabile," sharing—like all anatomists of his age—most of Galen's views.

=== The emptied chamber: doubt and dispersal ===
For more than a millennium the location of the sensus communis in the anterior ventricle was a matter of doctrine and diagram rather than dissection: it was assigned to a cell on schematic figures, derived from Galenic authority and the logic of the faculties, not inferred from anatomical observation. Andreas Vesalius, in De humani corporis fabrica (1543), drew the ventricles accurately, cited Gregor Reisch's cell-doctrine diagram, and cast doubt upon it, confessing that he could not understand how the brain performed "imagining, meditating, thinking, and remembering"; he removed the doctrine's anatomical support without offering a replacement. By cutting horizontal slices through the skull with the brain in situ, he exposed the ventricles at successive levels and illustrated for the first time the thalamus, striatum, colliculi, and stria terminalis. Of this rupture it has been said that "if any one year can be said to mark the point at which the medieval world ended and the modern one began, a strong case can be made for 1543." (The year 1543 also saw the publication of Copernicus's De revolutionibus orbium coelestium.)

When the faculties were at last relocated from the ventricles to the solid substance of the brain by Thomas Willis (Cerebri anatome, 1664), it was memory and imagination that were assigned to the cerebral parenchyma; the sensus communis, as a discretely localized power, was not re-seated but effectively dispersed. Having never been established in tissue by observation, the common sense of the cell doctrine did not survive the move from chamber to substance—ending not by relocation but by dissolution.

== Rene Descartes and modernism ==
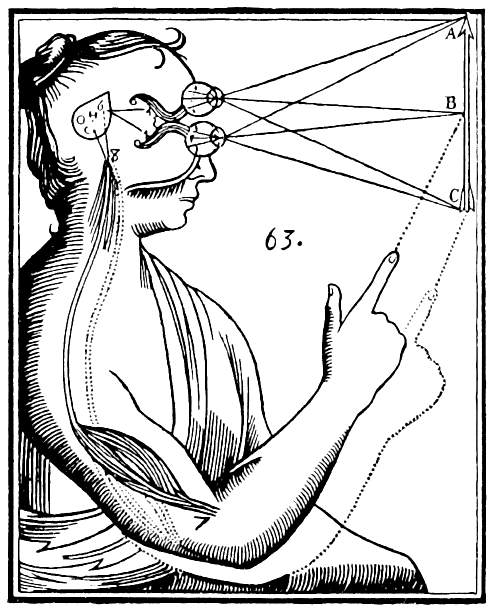
René Descartes' illustration of perception. Sensations from the senses travel to the bons sens in French (bona mens in Latin), his terms for the previous centuries' sensus communis, seated in the pineal gland inside the brain, and from there to the immaterial spirit.

One of the modern philosophers to accept something like the Aristotelian "common sense" was Descartes in the 17th century, but he also undermined it. He described this inner faculty when writing in Latin in his Meditations on first philosophy. The common sense is the link between the body and its senses, and the true human mind, which according to Descartes must be purely immaterial. Unlike Aristotle, who had placed it in the heart, by the time of Descartes this faculty was thought to be in the brain, and he located it in the pineal gland. Descartes' judgement of this common sense was that it was enough to persuade the human consciousness of the existence of physical things, but often in a very indistinct way. To get a more distinct understanding of things, it is more important to be methodical and mathematical. This line of thought was taken further, if not by Descartes himself then by those he influenced, until the concept of a faculty or organ of common sense was itself rejected.

René Descartes is generally credited with making obsolete the notion that there was an actual faculty within the human brain that functioned as a sensus communis. The French philosopher did not fully reject the idea of the inner senses, which he appropriated from the Scholastics. But he distanced himself from the Aristotelian conception of a common sense faculty, abandoning it entirely by the time of his Passions of the Soul (1649)..>

Contemporaries such as Gassendi and Hobbes went beyond Descartes in some ways in their rejection of Aristotelianism, rejecting explanations involving anything other than matter and motion, including the distinction between the animal-like judgement of sense perception, a special separate common sense, and the human mind or noûs, which Descartes had retained from Aristotelianism. In contrast to Descartes who "found it unacceptable to assume that sensory representations may enter the mental realm from without"...

According to Hobbes [...] man is no different from the other animals. [...] Hobbes' philosophy constituted a more profound rupture with Peripatetic thought. He accepted mental representations but [...] "All sense is fancy", as Hobbes famously put it, with the only exception of extension and motion.

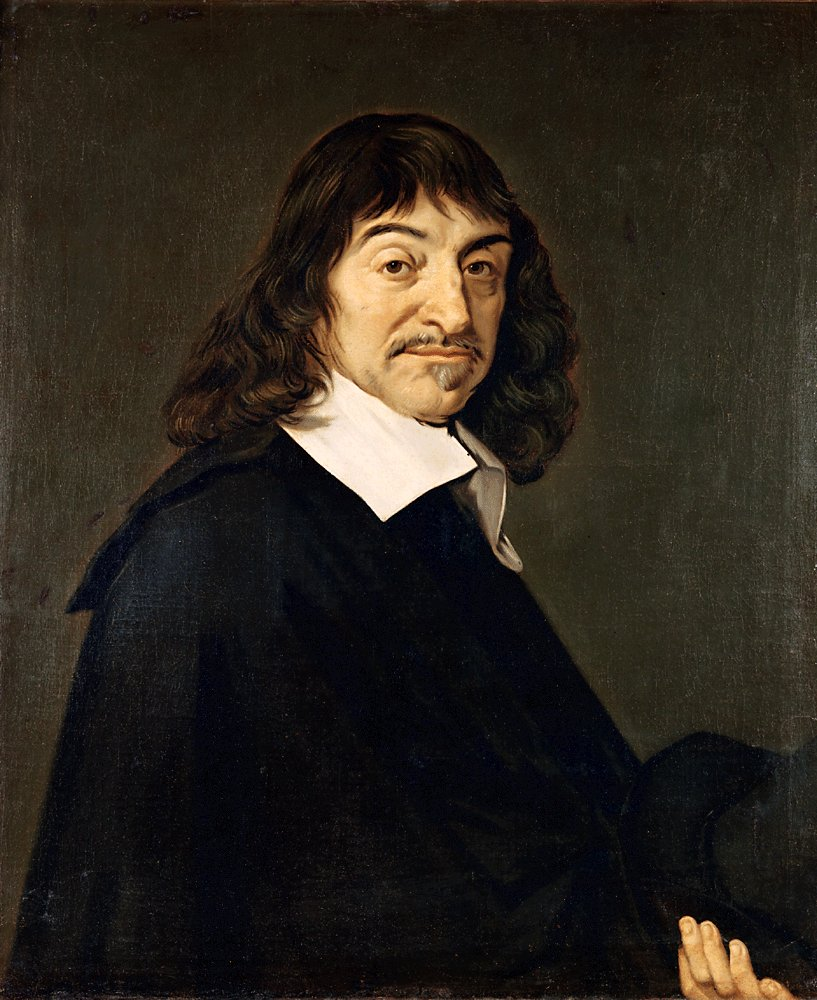
René Descartes is the source of the most common way of understanding the "common sense" as a widely spread type of judgement.

But Descartes used two different terms in his work, not only the Latin term "sensus communis", but also the French term bon sens, with which he opens his Discourse on Method. And this second concept survived better. This work was written in French, and does not directly discuss the Aristotelian technical theory of perception. Bon sens is the equivalent of modern English "common sense" or "good sense". As the Aristotelian meaning of the Latin term began to be forgotten after Descartes, his discussion of bon sens gave a new way of defining sensus communis in various European languages (including Latin, even though Descartes himself did not translate bon sens as sensus communis, but treated them as two separate things).

== See also ==
- Cell doctrine
- Internal senses
- Ventricular system
- Common sense

== Bibliography ==
- Brann, Eva (1991), The World of the Imagination: Sum and Substance, Rowman & Littlefield
- Gregorić, Pavel (2007), Aristotle on the Common Sense, Oxford University Press, ISBN 9780191608490
- Gregorić, Pavel (2017), "Alexander of Aphrodisias on the Common Sense", Filozofski vestnik, 38: 47–64
- Heller-Roazen, Daniel (2008), Nichols; Kablitz; Calhoun (eds.), Rethinking the Medieval Senses, Johns Hopkins University Press, ISBN 9780801887369
- Lee, Mi-Kyoung (2011), "The distinction between primary and secondary qualities in ancient Greek philosophy", in Nolan, Lawrence (ed.), Primary and Secondary Qualities: The Historical and Ongoing Debate, Oxford, ISBN 978-0-19-955615-1
- Rosenfeld, Sophia (2011), Common Sense: A Political History, Harvard University Press, ISBN 9780674061286
- Sachs, Joe (2001), Aristotle's On the Soul and On Memory and Recollection, Green Lion Press, ISBN 978-1-888009-17-0
- Spruit, Leen (1994), Species Intelligibilis: From Perception to Knowledge. I. Classical roots and medieval discussions, Brill, ISBN 978-9004098831
- Spruit, Leen (1995), Species Intelligibilis: From Perception to Knowledge. II. Renaissance controversies, later scholasticism, and the elimination of the intelligible species in modern philosophy, Brill, ISBN 978-9004103962
