= Common sense =

Basic level of knowledge and judgement shared by nearly all people

Common sense (from Latin sensus communis) is "knowledge, judgement, and taste which is more or less universal and which is held more or less without reflection or argument". As such, it is often considered to represent the basic level of sound practical judgement or knowledge of basic facts that any adult human being ought to possess. It is "common" in the sense of being shared by nearly all people. Relevant terms from other languages used in such discussions include the aforementioned Latin, itself translating Ancient Greek κοινὴ αἴσθησις (koinḕ aísthēsis), and French bon sens. However, these are not straightforward translations in all contexts, and in English different shades of meaning have developed. In philosophical and scientific contexts, since the Age of Enlightenment the term "common sense" has been used for rhetorical effect both approvingly and disapprovingly. On the one hand, it has been a standard for good taste, good sense, and source of scientific and logical axioms. On the other hand, it has been equated to conventional wisdom, vulgar prejudice, and superstition.

"Common sense" has at least two older and more specialized meanings which have influenced the modern meanings, and are still discussed in philosophy—one is specific to the common ability to perceive using the senses, and the other relates to a shared sense of community or humanity. The original historical meaning, often referred to using the medieval Latin term Sensus communis, is the "sense" within the animal soul (ψῡχή, psūkhḗ) originally proposed by Aristotle, which perceives real things based on different sensory perceptions from distinct senses (sights, sounds, smells and so on). The second philosophical use of the term is Roman-influenced, and is used for the natural human sensitivity for other humans and the community. Just like the everyday meaning, both of the philosophical meanings refer to a type of basic awareness and ability to judge that most people are expected to share naturally, even if they cannot explain why. All these meanings of "common sense", including the everyday ones, are interconnected in a complex history and have evolved during important political and philosophical debates in modern Western civilisation, notably concerning science, politics and economics. The interplay between the meanings has come to be particularly notable in English, as opposed to other western European languages, and the English term has in turn become international.

It was at the beginning of the 18th century that this old philosophical term first acquired its modern English meaning: "Those plain, self-evident truths or conventional wisdom that one needed no sophistication to grasp and no proof to accept precisely because they accorded so well with the basic (common sense) intellectual capacities and experiences of the whole social body." Interest in this concept was partly in reaction to Descartes's critical remarks about the French term bon sens, and it was connected to the dispute between "rationalism" and "empiricism" and the arguments for different types of scientific method. In the opening line of one of his most famous books, Discourse on Method, Descartes stated that everyone has a similar and sufficient amount of common or good sense (bon sens), but it is rarely used well. Therefore, a skeptical logical method needs to be followed, and common sense should not be overly relied upon. In the ensuing 18th century Enlightenment era, common sense came to be seen more positively as the basis for empiricist modern thinking. It was contrasted to metaphysics, which was, like Cartesianism, associated with the Ancien Régime. Thomas Paine's polemical pamphlet Common Sense (1776) has been described as the most influential political pamphlet of the 18th century, affecting both the American and French revolutions. Today, the concept of common sense, and how it should best be used, remains linked to many of the most perennial topics in epistemology and ethics, with special focus often directed at the philosophy of the modern social sciences.

== Classical philosophical predecessors ==
Aristotle, the first person known to have discussed "common sense", described it as the ability with which animals (including humans) process sense-perceptions, memories and imagination (φρονεῖν, phroneîn) to reach many types of basic judgments. In his scheme, only humans have real reasoned thinking (νοεῖν, noeîn), which takes them beyond their common sense.

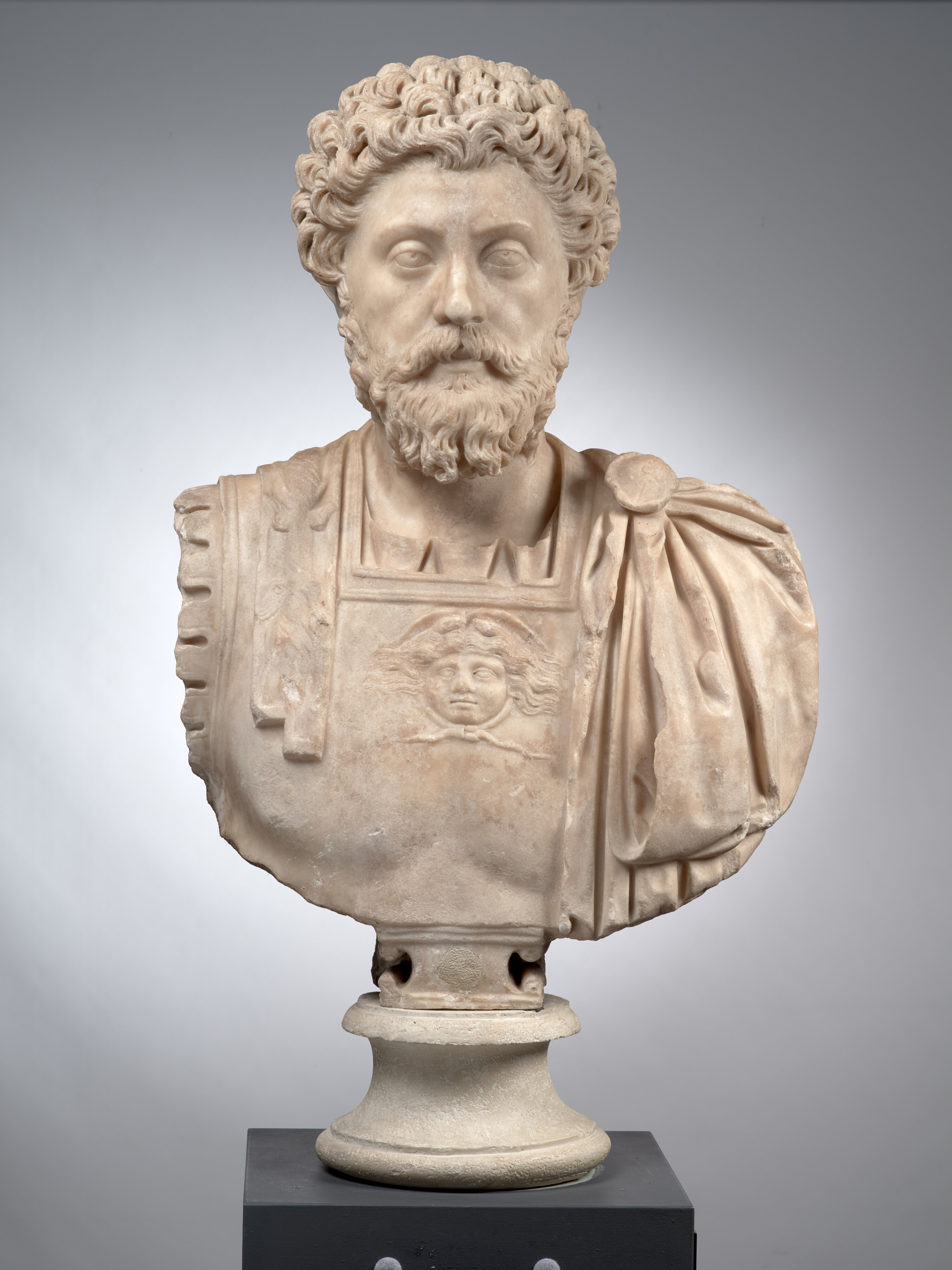
Marcus Aurelius, emperor and Stoic philosopher, and an important influence upon the concept of "humanist" common sense

The origin of the term "common sense" (Latin: Sensus communis, Ancient Greek: koinḕ aísthēsis) is in the works of Aristotle, although the way he used the term had a very different meaning to the one most common in modern English. Nevertheless, his original "common sense" represents a very long-lasting and successful proposal, which can still be referred to in English using the English, Greek or Latin terms. Heller-Roazen (2008) writes that "In different ways the philosophers of medieval Latin and Arabic tradition, from Al-Farabi to Avicenna, Averroës, Albert, and Thomas, found in the De Anima and the Parva Naturalia the scattered elements of a coherent doctrine of the "central" faculty of the sensuous soul." It was "one of the most successful and resilient of Aristotelian notions".

The Latin term Sensus communis developed yet another meaning during the time of the Roman Empire in the earlier Latin of the Roman Empire, different from both Aristotle's concept and the most typical meaning in modern English, and this also continues to be discussed in philosophical literature. These especially Roman meanings were apparently influenced by several Stoic Greek terms with the word koinḗ (κοινή, 'common, shared'); not only koinḕ aísthēsis, but also such terms as koinós noûs (κοινός νοῦς, 'common mind/thought/reason'), koinḗ énnoia (κοινή ἔννοιᾰ), and koinonoēmosúnē, all of which involve noûs—something, at least in Aristotle, that would not be present in "lower" animals.

- Koinḗ énnoia is a term from Stoic philosophy, a Greek philosophy, influenced by Aristotle, and influential in Rome. This refers to shared notions, or common conceptions, that are either in-born or imprinted by the senses onto the soul. Unfortunately few true Stoic texts survive, and our understanding of their technical terminology is limited.
- Koinós noûs is a term found in Epictetus (III.vi.8), a Stoic philosopher. C.S. Lewis (1967, p. 146) believed this to be close to a modern English meaning of "common sense", "the elementary mental outfit of the normal man", something like intelligence. He noted that sensus could be a translation of noûs, (for example in the Vulgate Bible), but he only found one clear case of a Latin text showing this apparent meaning, a text by Phaedrus the fable writer.
- Koinonoēmosúnē is found only in the work of the emperor Marcus Aurelius (Meditations I.16), also known as a Stoic. He uses the word on its own in a list of things he learned from his adopted father. Anthony Ashley Cooper, 3rd Earl of Shaftesbury felt it represented the Stoic Greek original, which gave the special Roman meaning of sensus communis, especially when used to refer to someone's public spirit. He explained the change of meaning as being due to the specific way that Stoics understood perception and intellect, saying that one should "consider withal how small the distinction was in that Philosophy, between the ὑπόληψις [conjecture], and the vulgar αἴσθησις [perception]; how generally Passion was by those Philosophers brought under the Head of Opinion".

Roman communis sensus was probably influenced instead by a different term of Aristotle used in his study of rhetoric, a subject that Aristotle was the first to systematize. In rhetoric, a prudent speaker must take account of opinions (δόξαι, dóxai) that are widely held. Aristotle referred to such commonly held beliefs not as koinaí dóxai (κοιναί δόξαι, lit. ''common opinions''), which is a term he used for self-evident logical axioms, but with other terms such as éndóxa (ἔνδόξα).

In his Rhetoric for example Aristotle mentions "koinōn [...] tàs písteis" or "common beliefs", saying that "our proofs and arguments must rest on generally accepted principles, [...] when speaking of converse with the multitude". In a similar passage in his own work on rhetoric, De Oratore, Cicero wrote that "in oratory the very cardinal sin is to depart from the language of everyday life and the usage approved by the sense of the community." The sense of the community is in this case a translation of "communis sensus" in the Latin of Cicero.

Whether the Latin writers such as Cicero deliberately used this Aristotelian rhetoric term in a new more peculiarly Roman way, probably also influenced by Greek Stoicism, therefore remains a subject of discussion. Schaeffer (1990, p. 112) has proposed for example that the Roman Republic maintained a very "oral" culture whereas in Aristotle's time rhetoric had come under heavy criticism from philosophers such as Socrates. Peters Agnew (2008) argues, in agreement with Shaftesbury, that the concept developed from the Stoic concept of ethical virtue, influenced by Aristotle, but emphasizing the role of both individual perception and shared communal understanding. A complex of ideas attached itself to the term, to be almost forgotten in the Middle Ages, and eventually returning into ethical discussion in 18th-century Europe, after Descartes.

As with other meanings of common sense, for the Romans of the classical era "it designates a sensibility shared by all, from which one may deduce a number of fundamental judgments, that need not, or cannot, be questioned by rational reflection". But even though Cicero did at least once use the term in a manuscript on Plato's Timaeus (concerning a primordial "sense, one and common for all [...] connected with nature"), he and other Roman authors did not normally use it as a technical term limited to discussion about sense perception, as Aristotle apparently had in De Anima, and as the Scholastics later would in the Middle Ages. Instead of referring to all animal judgment, it was used to describe pre-rational, widely shared human beliefs, and therefore it was a near equivalent to the concept of humanitas. This was a term that could be used by Romans to imply not only human nature, but also humane conduct, good breeding, refined manners, and so on. Apart from Cicero, Quintilian, Lucretius, Seneca, Horace and some of the most influential Roman authors influenced by Aristotle's rhetoric and philosophy used the Latin term "sensus communis" in a range of such ways. As C. S. Lewis wrote:

Quintilian says it is better to send a boy to school than to have a private tutor for him at home; for if he is kept away from the herd (congressus) how will he ever learn that sensus which we call communis? (I, ii, 20). On the lowest level it means tact. In Horace the man who talks to you when you obviously don't want to talk lacks communis sensus.

Compared to Aristotle and his strictest medieval followers, these Roman authors were not so strict about the boundary between animal-like common sense and specially human reasoning. As discussed above, Aristotle had attempted to make a clear distinction between, on the one hand, imagination and the sense perception which both use the sensible koiná, and which animals also have; and, on the other hand, noûs (intellect) and reason, which perceives another type of koiná, the intelligible forms, which (according to Aristotle) only humans have. In other words, these Romans allowed that people could have animal-like shared understandings of reality, not just in terms of memories of sense perceptions, but in terms of the way they would tend to explain things, and in the language they use.

== Cartesian ==
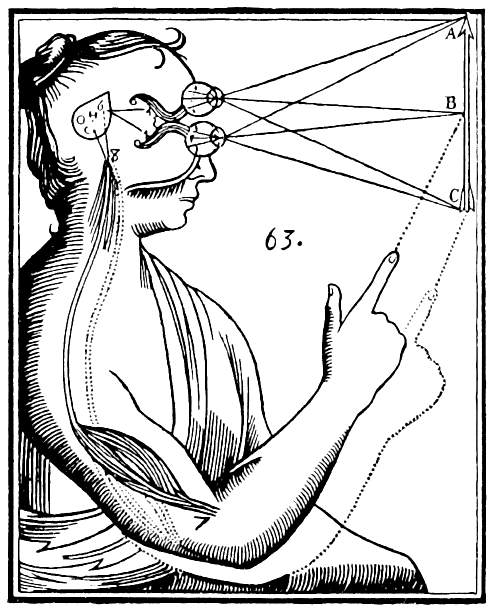
René Descartes' illustration of perception. Sensations from the senses travel to sensus communis, seated in the pineal gland inside the brain, and from there to the immaterial spirit.

One of the last notable philosophers to accept something like the Aristotelian "common sense" was Descartes in the 17th century, but he also undermined it. He described this inner faculty when writing in Latin in his Meditations on first philosophy. The common sense is the link between the body and its senses, and the true human mind, which according to Descartes must be purely immaterial. Unlike Aristotle, who had placed it in the heart, by the time of Descartes this faculty was thought to be in the brain, and he located it in the pineal gland. Descartes' judgement of this common sense was that it was enough to persuade the human consciousness of the existence of physical things, but often in a very indistinct way. To get a more distinct understanding of things, it is more important to be methodical and mathematical. This line of thought was taken further, if not by Descartes himself then by those he influenced, until the concept of a faculty or organ of common sense was itself rejected.

René Descartes is generally credited with making obsolete the notion that there was an actual faculty within the human brain that functioned as a sensus communis. The French philosopher did not fully reject the idea of the inner senses, which he appropriated from the Scholastics. But he distanced himself from the Aristotelian conception of a common sense faculty, abandoning it entirely by the time of his Passions of the Soul (1649).

Contemporaries such as Gassendi and Hobbes went beyond Descartes in some ways in their rejection of Aristotelianism, rejecting explanations involving anything other than matter and motion, including the distinction between the animal-like judgement of sense perception, a special separate common sense, and the human mind or noûs, which Descartes had retained from Aristotelianism. In contrast to Descartes who "found it unacceptable to assume that sensory representations may enter the mental realm from without"...

According to Hobbes [...] man is no different from the other animals. [...] Hobbes' philosophy constituted a more profound rupture with Peripatetic thought. He accepted mental representations but [...] "All sense is fancy", as Hobbes famously put it, with the only exception of extension and motion.

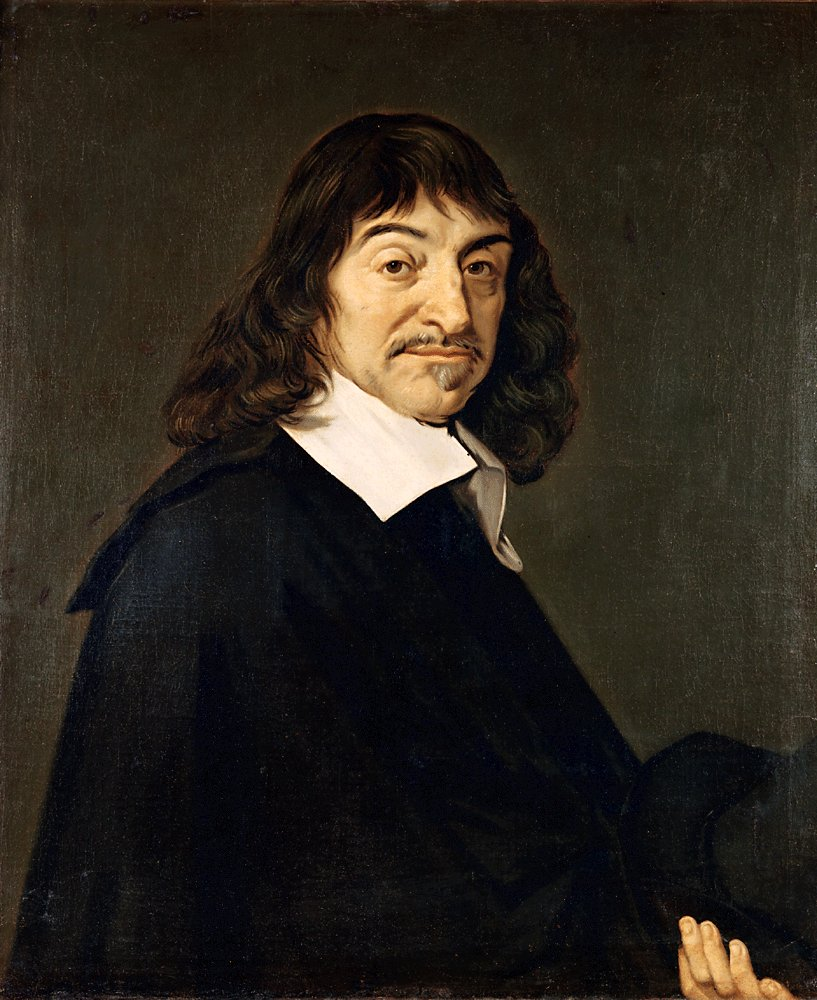
René Descartes is the source of the most common way of understanding the "common sense" as a widely spread type of judgement.

But Descartes used two different terms in his work, not only the Latin term "sensus communis", but also the French term bon sens, with which he opens his Discourse on Method. And this second concept survived better. This work was written in French, and does not directly discuss the Aristotelian technical theory of perception. Bon sens is the equivalent of modern English "common sense" or "good sense". As the Aristotelian meaning of the Latin term began to be forgotten after Descartes, his discussion of bon sens gave a new way of defining sensus communis in various European languages (including Latin, even though Descartes himself did not translate bon sens as sensus communis, but treated them as two separate things).

Schaeffer (1990, p. 2) writes that "Descartes is the source of the most common meaning of common sense today: practical judgment". Gilson noted that Descartes actually gave bon sens two related meanings, first the basic and widely shared ability to judge true and false, which he also calls raison (lit. ''reason''); and second, wisdom, the perfected version of the first. The Latin term Descartes uses, bona mens (lit. ''good mind''), derives from the Stoic author Seneca who only used it in the second sense. Descartes was being original.

The idea that now became influential, developed in both the Latin and French works of Descartes, though coming from different directions, is that common good sense (and indeed sense perception) is not reliable enough for the new Cartesian method of skeptical reasoning. The Cartesian project to replace common good sense with clearly defined mathematical reasoning was aimed at certainty, and not mere probability. It was promoted further by people such as Hobbes, Spinoza, and others and continues to have important impacts on everyday life. In France, the Netherlands, Belgium, Spain and Italy, it was in its initial florescence associated with the administration of Catholic empires of the competing Bourbon, and Habsburg dynasties, both seeking to centralize their power in a modern way, responding to Machiavellianism and Protestantism as part of the Counter-Reformation.

Cartesian theory offered a justification for innovative social change achieved through the courts and administration, an ability to adapt the law to changing social conditions by making the basis for legislation "rational" rather than "traditional".

So after Descartes, critical attention turned from Aristotle and his theory of perception, and more towards Descartes' own treatment of common good sense, concerning which several 18th-century authors found help in Roman literature.

== Post-Cartesian ==
=== Epistemology ===
During the Enlightenment, Descartes' insistence upon a mathematical-style method of thinking that treated common sense and the sense perceptions sceptically was accepted in some ways, but also criticized. On the one hand, the approach of Descartes is and was seen as radically sceptical in some ways. On the other hand, like the Scholastics before him, while being cautious of common sense, Descartes was instead seen to rely too much on undemonstrable metaphysical assumptions to justify his method, especially in its separation of mind and body (with the sensus communis linking them). Cartesians such as Henricus Regius, Geraud de Cordemoy, and Nicolas Malebranche realized that Descartes's logic could give no evidence of the "external world" at all, meaning it had to be taken on faith. Though his own proposed solution was even more controversial, Berkeley famously wrote that enlightenment requires a "revolt from metaphysical notions to the plain dictates of nature and common sense". Descartes and the Cartesian "rationalists", rejected reliance upon experience, the senses and inductive reasoning, and seemed to insist that certainty was possible. The alternative to induction, deductive reasoning, demanded a mathematical approach, starting from simple and certain assumptions. This in turn required Descartes (and later rationalists such as Kant) to assume the existence of innate or "a priori" knowledge in the human mind—a controversial proposal.

In contrast to the rationalists, the "empiricists" took their orientation from Francis Bacon, whose arguments for methodical science were earlier than those of Descartes, and less directed towards mathematics and certainty. Bacon is known for his doctrine of the "idols of the mind", presented in his Novum Organum, and in his Essays described normal human thinking as biased towards believing in lies. But he was also the opponent of all metaphysical explanations of nature, or over-reaching speculation generally, and a proponent of science based on small steps of experience, experimentation and methodical induction. So while agreeing upon the need to help common sense with a methodical approach, he also insisted that starting from common sense, including especially common sense perceptions, was acceptable and correct. He influenced Locke and Pierre Bayle, in their critique of metaphysics, and in 1733 Voltaire "introduced him as the "father" of the scientific method" to a French audience, an understanding that was widespread by 1750. Together with this, references to "common sense" became positive and associated with modernity, in contrast to negative references to metaphysics, which was associated with the Ancien Régime.

As mentioned above, in terms of the more general epistemological implications of common sense, modern philosophy came to use the term common sense like Descartes, abandoning Aristotle's theory. While Descartes had distanced himself from it, John Locke abandoned it more openly, while still maintaining the idea of "common sensibles" that are perceived. But then George Berkeley abandoned both. David Hume agreed with Berkeley on this, and Locke and Vico saw themselves as following Bacon more than Descartes. In his synthesis, which he saw as the first Baconian analysis of man (something the lesser-known Vico had claimed earlier), common sense is entirely built up from shared experience and shared innate emotions, and therefore it is indeed imperfect as a basis for any attempt to know the truth or to make the best decision. But he defended the possibility of science without absolute certainty, and consistently described common sense as giving a valid answer to the challenge of extreme skepticism. Concerning such sceptics, he wrote:

But would these prejudiced reasoners reflect a moment, there are many obvious instances and arguments, sufficient to undeceive them, and make them enlarge their maxims and principles. Do they not see the vast variety of inclinations and pursuits among our species; where each man seems fully satisfied with his own course of life, and would esteem it the greatest unhappiness to be confined to that of his neighbour? Do they not feel in themselves, that what pleases at one time, displeases at another, by the change of inclination; and that it is not in their power, by their utmost efforts, to recall that taste or appetite, which formerly bestowed charms on what now appears indifferent or disagreeable? [...] Do you come to a philosopher as to a cunning man, to learn something by magic or witchcraft, beyond what can be known by common prudence and discretion?

=== Humanist ethics ===
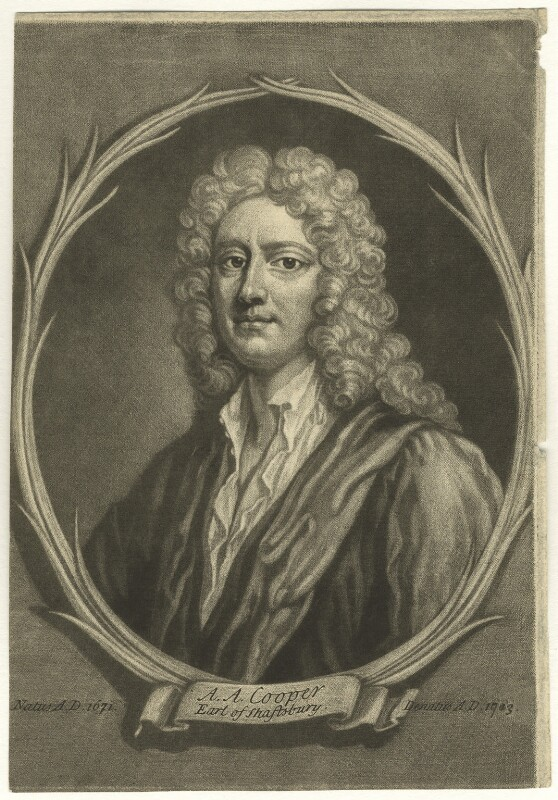
Anthony Ashley-Cooper, 3rd Earl of Shaftesbury, a proponent of a Roman-inspired concept of common sense

Once Thomas Hobbes and Spinoza had applied Cartesian approaches to political philosophy, concerns about the inhumanity of the deductive approach of Descartes increased. With this in mind, Shaftesbury and Giambattista Vico presented new arguments for the importance of the Roman understanding of common sense, in what is now often referred to, after Hans-Georg Gadamer, as a humanist interpretation of the term. Their concern had several inter-related aspects. One ethical concern was the deliberately simplified method that treated human communities as made up of selfish independent individuals (methodological individualism), ignoring the sense of community that the Romans understood as part of common sense. Another connected epistemological concern was that by considering common good sense as inherently inferior to Cartesian conclusions developed from simple assumptions, an important type of wisdom was being arrogantly ignored.

The Earl's seminal 1709 essay Sensus Communis: An Essay on the Freedom of Wit and Humour was a highly erudite and influential defense of the use of irony and humour in serious discussions, at least among men of "Good Breeding". He drew upon authors such as Seneca, Juvenal, Horace and Marcus Aurelius, for whom, he saw, common sense was not just a reference to widely held vulgar opinions, but something cultivated among educated people living in better communities. One aspect of this, later taken up by authors such as Kant, was good taste. Another very important aspect of common sense particularly interesting to later British political philosophers such as Francis Hutcheson was what came to be called moral sentiment, which is different from a tribal or factional sentiment, but a more general fellow feeling that is very important for larger communities:

A publick Spirit can come only from a social Feeling or Sense of Partnership with Human Kind. Now there are none so far from being Partners in this Sense, or sharers in this common Affection, as they who scarcely know an Equall, nor consider themselves as subject to any law of Fellowship or Community. And thus Morality and good Government go together.

Hutcheson described it as, "a Publick Sense, viz. "our Determination to be pleased with the Happiness of others, and to be uneasy at their Misery."" which, he explains, "was sometimes called κοινονοημοσύνη or Sensus Communis by some of the Antients".

A reaction to Shaftesbury in defense of the Hobbesian approach of treating communities as driven by individual self-interest was not long coming in Bernard Mandeville's controversial works. Indeed, this approach was never fully rejected, at least in economics. And so despite the criticism heaped upon Mandeville and Hobbes by Adam Smith, Hutcheson's student and successor in Glasgow university, Smith made self-interest a core assumption within nascent modern economics, specifically as part of the practical justification for allowing free markets.

By the late Enlightenment period in the 18th century, the communal sense had become the "moral sense" or "moral sentiment" referred to by Hume and Adam Smith, the latter writing in plural of the "moral sentiments" with the key one being sympathy, which was not so much a public spirit as such, but a kind of extension of self-interest. Jeremy Bentham gives a summary of the plethora of terms used in British philosophy by the nineteenth century to describe common sense in discussions about ethics:

Another man comes and alters the phrase: leaving out moral, and putting in common, in the room of it. He then tells you, that his common sense teaches him what is right and wrong, as surely as the other's moral sense did: meaning by common sense, a sense of some kind or other, which he says, is possessed by all mankind: the sense of those, whose sense is not the same as the author's, being struck out of the account as not worth taking.

This was at least to some extent opposed to the Hobbesian approach, still today normal in economic theory, of trying to understand all human behaviour as fundamentally selfish, and would also be a foil to the new ethics of Kant. This understanding of a moral sense or public spirit remains a subject for discussion, although the term "common sense" is no longer commonly used for the sentiment itself. In several European languages, a separate term for this type of common sense is used. For example, French sens commun and German Gemeinsinn are used for this feeling of human solidarity, while bon sens (good sense) and gesunder Verstand (healthy understanding) are the terms for everyday "common sense".

According to Gadamer, at least in French and British philosophy a moral element in appeals to common sense (or bon sens), such as found in Reid, remains normal to this day. But according to Gadamer, the civic quality implied in discussion of sensus communis in other European countries did not take root in the German philosophy of the 18th and 19th centuries, despite the fact it consciously imitated much in English and French philosophy. "Sensus communis was understood as a purely theoretical judgment, parallel to moral consciousness (conscience) and taste." The concept of sensus communis "was emptied and intellectualized by the German enlightenment". But German philosophy was becoming internationally important at this same time.

Gadamer notes one less-known exception—the Württemberg pietism, inspired by the 18th century Swabian churchman, M. Friedrich Christoph Oetinger, who appealed to Enlightenment figures in his critique of the Cartesian rationalism of Leibniz and Wolff, who were the most important German philosophers before Kant.

=== Giambattista Vico ===
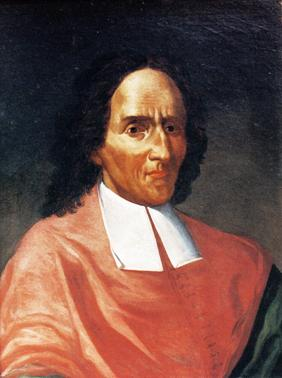
Giambattista Vico. A defender of classical education in rhetoric, who analysed evidence of ancient wisdom in common sense.

Vico, who taught classical rhetoric in Naples (where Shaftesbury died) under a Cartesian-influenced Spanish government, was not widely read until the 20th century, but his writings on common sense have been an important influence upon Hans-Georg Gadamer, Benedetto Croce and Antonio Gramsci. Vico united the Roman and Greek meanings of the term communis sensus. Vico's initial use of the term, which was of much inspiration to Gadamer for example, appears in his On the Study Methods of our Time, which was partly a defense of his own profession, given the reformist pressure upon both his University and the legal system in Naples. It presents common sense as something adolescents need to be trained in if they are not to "break into odd and arrogant behaviour when adulthood is reached", whereas teaching the Cartesian method on its own harms common sense and stunts intellectual development. Rhetoric and elocution are not just for legal debate, but also educate young people to use their sense perceptions and their perceptions more broadly, building a fund of remembered images in their imagination, and then using ingenuity in creating linking metaphors, in order to make enthymemes. Enthymemes are reasonings about uncertain truths and probabilities—as opposed to the Cartesian method, which was skeptical of all that could not be dealt with as syllogisms, including raw perceptions of physical bodies. Hence common sense is not just a "guiding standard of eloquence" but also "the standard of practical judgment". The imagination or fantasy, which under traditional Aristotelianism was often equated with the koinḕ aísthēsis, is built up under this training, becoming the "fund" (to use Schaeffer's term) accepting not only memories of things seen by an individual, but also metaphors and images known in the community, including the ones out of which language itself is made.

In its mature version, Vico's conception of sensus communis is defined by him as "judgment without reflection, shared by an entire class, an entire people, and entire nation, or the entire human race". Vico proposed his own anti-Cartesian methodology for a new Baconian science, inspired, he said, by Plato, Tacitus, Francis Bacon and Grotius. In this he went further than his predecessors concerning the ancient certainties available within vulgar common sense. What is required, according to his new science, is to find the common sense shared by different people and nations. He made this a basis for a new and better-founded approach to discuss Natural Law, improving upon Grotius, John Selden, and Pufendorf who he felt had failed to convince, because they could claim no authority from nature. Unlike Grotius, Vico went beyond looking for one single set of similarities amongst nations but also established rules about how natural law properly changes as peoples change, and has to be judged relative to this state of development. He thus developed a detailed view of an evolving wisdom of peoples. Ancient forgotten wisdoms, he claimed, could be re-discovered by analysis of languages and myths formed under their influence. This is comparable to both Montesquieu's Spirit of the Laws, as well as much later Hegelian historicism, both of which apparently developed without any awareness of Vico's work.

=== Thomas Reid and the Scottish school ===
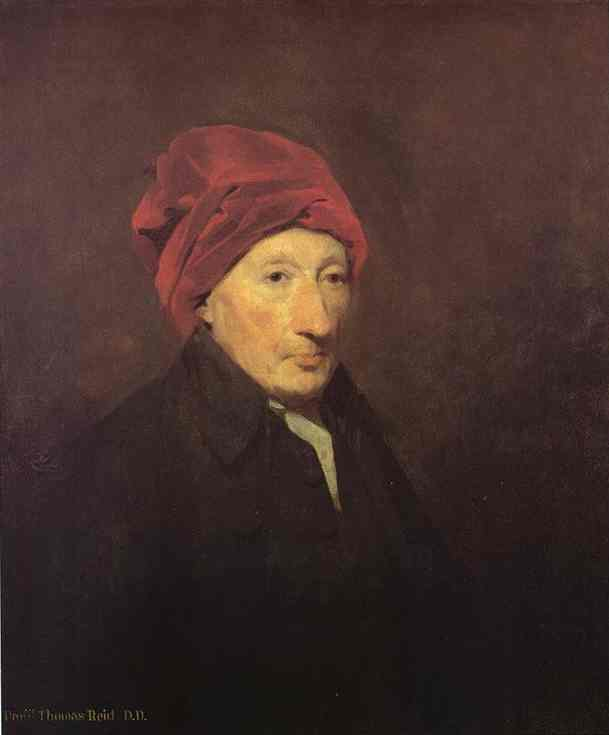
Thomas Reid, founder of the Scottish school of Common Sense

Contemporary with Hume, but critical of Hume's scepticism, a so-called Scottish school of Common Sense formed, whose basic principle was enunciated by its founder and greatest figure, Thomas Reid:

If there are certain principles, as I think there are, which the constitution of our nature leads us to believe, and which we are under a necessity to take for granted in the common concerns of life, without being able to give a reason for them — these are what we call the principles of common sense; and what is manifestly contrary to them, is what we call absurd.

Thomas Reid was a successor to Francis Hutcheson and Adam Smith as Professor of Moral Philosophy, Glasgow. While Reid's interests lay in the defense of common sense as a type of self-evident knowledge available to individuals, this was also part of a defense of natural law in the style of Grotius. He believed his use of "common sense" encompassed both the communal common sense described by Shaftesbury and Hutcheson, and the perceptive powers described by Aristotelians.

Reid was criticised, partly for his critique of Hume, by Kant and J. S. Mill, who were two of the most important influences in nineteenth-century philosophy. He was blamed for over-stating Hume's scepticism of commonly held beliefs, and more importantly for not perceiving the problem with any claim that common sense could ever fulfill Cartesian (or Kantian) demands for absolute knowledge. Reid furthermore emphasized inborn common sense as opposed to only experience and sense perception. In this way his common sense has a similarity to the assertion of a priori knowledge asserted by rationalists like Descartes and Kant, despite Reid's criticism of Descartes concerning his theory of ideas. Hume was critical of Reid on this point.

Despite the criticism, the influence of the Scottish school was notable for example upon American pragmatism, and modern Thomism. The influence has been particularly important concerning the epistemological importance of a sensus communis for any possibility of rational discussion between people.

=== Immanuel Kant and common sense aesthetics ===
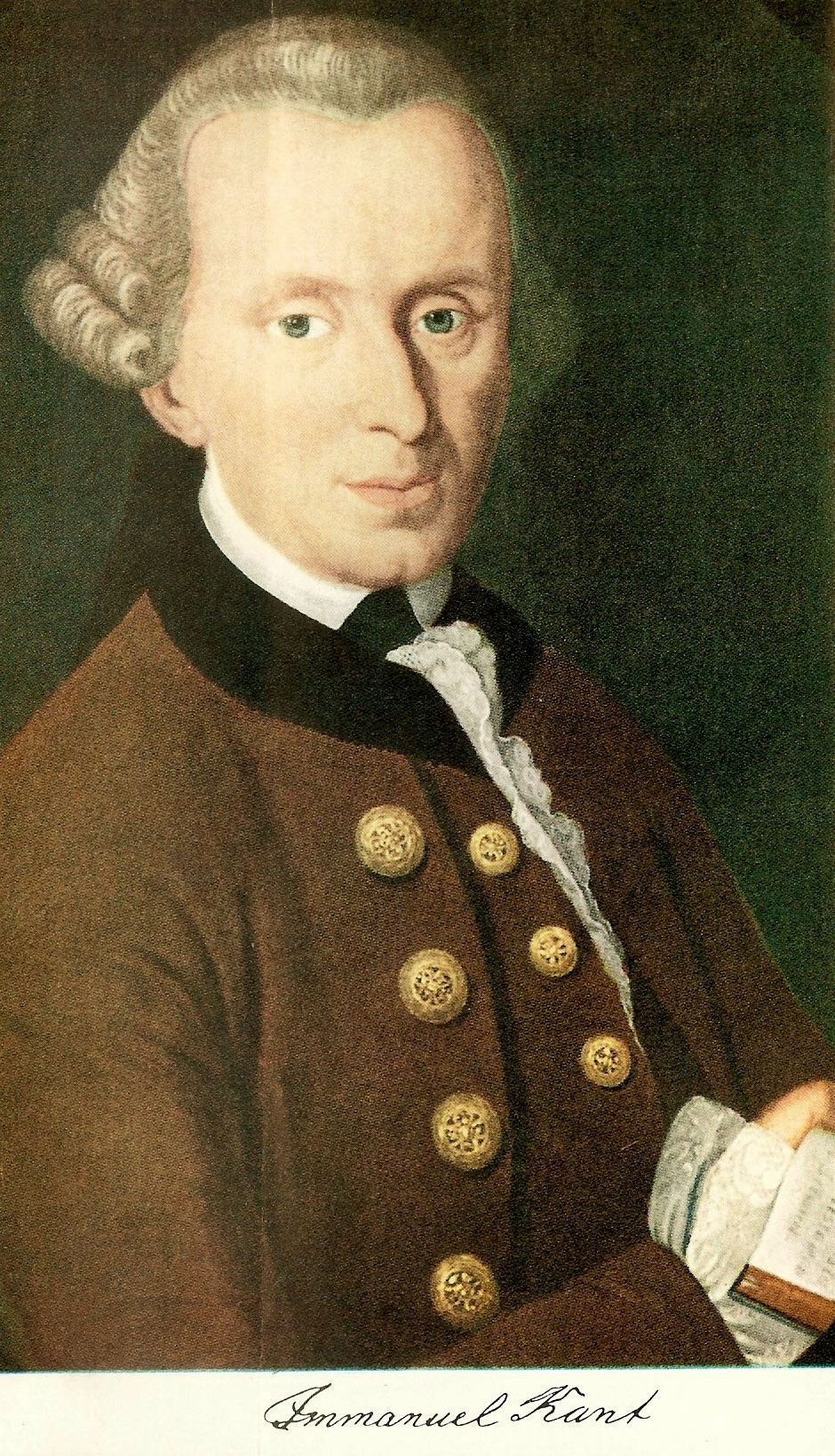
Immanuel Kant proposed that sensus communis (German: Gemeinsinn) was a useful concept for understanding aesthetics, but he was critical of the Scottish school's appeals to ordinary widely shared common sense (gesunden Verstand) as a basis of real knowledge.

Immanuel Kant developed a new variant of the idea of sensus communis, noting how having a sensitivity for what opinions are widely shared and comprehensible gives a sort of standard for judgment, and objective discussion, at least in the field of aesthetics and taste:

The common Understanding of men [gemeine Menschenverstand], which, as the mere sound (not yet cultivated) Understanding, we regard as the least to be expected from any one claiming the name of man, has therefore the doubtful honour of being given the name of common sense [Namen des Gemeinsinnes] (sensus communis); and in such a way that by the name common (not merely in our language, where the word actually has a double signification, but in many others) we understand vulgar, that which is everywhere met with, the possession of which indicates absolutely no merit or superiority.

But under the sensus communis we must include the Idea of a communal sense [eines gemeinschaftlichen Sinnes], i.e. of a faculty of judgement, which in its reflection takes account (a priori) of the mode of representation of all other men in thought; in order as it were to compare its judgement with the collective Reason of humanity, and thus to escape the illusion arising from the private conditions that could be so easily taken for objective, which would injuriously affect the judgement.

Kant saw this concept as answering a particular need in his system: "the question of why aesthetic judgments are valid: since aesthetic judgments are a perfectly normal function of the same faculties of cognition involved in ordinary cognition, they will have the same universal validity as such ordinary acts of cognition".

But Kant's overall approach was very different from those of Hume or Vico. Like Descartes, he rejected appeals to uncertain sense perception and common sense (except in the very specific way he describes concerning aesthetics), or the prejudices of one's "Weltanschauung", and tried to give a new way to certainty through methodical logic, and an assumption of a type of a priori knowledge. He was also not in agreement with Reid and the Scottish school, who he criticized in his Prolegomena to Any Future Metaphysics as using "the magic wand of common sense", and not properly confronting the "metaphysical" problem defined by Hume, which Kant wanted to be solved scientifically—the problem of how to use reason to consider how one ought to act.

Kant used different words to refer to his aesthetic sensus communis, for which he used Latin or else German Gemeinsinn, and the more general English meaning which he associated with Reid and his followers, for which he used various terms such as gemeinen Menscheverstand, gesunden Verstand, or gemeinen Verstand.

According to Gadamer, in contrast to the "wealth of meaning" brought from the Roman tradition into humanism, Kant "developed his moral philosophy in explicit opposition to the doctrine of 'moral feeling' that had been worked out in English philosophy". The moral imperative "cannot be based on feeling, not even if one does not mean an individual's feeling but common moral sensibility". For Kant, the sensus communis only applied to taste, and the meaning of taste was also narrowed as it was no longer understood as any kind of knowledge. Taste, for Kant, is universal only in that it results from "the free play of all our cognitive powers", and is communal only in that it "abstracts from all subjective, private conditions such as attractiveness and emotion".

Kant himself did not see himself as a relativist, and was aiming to give knowledge a more solid basis, but as Richard J. Bernstein remarks, reviewing this same critique of Gadamer:

Once we begin to question whether there is a common faculty of taste (a sensus communis), we are easily led down the path to relativism. And this is what did happen after Kant—so much so that today it is extraordinarily difficult to retrieve any idea of taste or aesthetic judgment that is more than the expression of personal preferences. Ironically (given Kant's intentions), the same tendency has worked itself out with a vengeance with regards to all judgments of value, including moral judgments.

== Contemporary philosophy ==
=== Epistemology ===
Continuing the tradition of Reid and the Enlightenment generally, the common sense of individuals trying to understand reality continues to be a serious subject in philosophy. In America, Reid influenced C. S. Peirce, the founder of the philosophical movement now known as Pragmatism, which has become internationally influential. One of the names Peirce used for the movement was "Critical Common-Sensism". Peirce, who wrote after Charles Darwin, suggested that Reid and Kant's ideas about inborn common sense could be explained by evolution. But while such beliefs might be well adapted to primitive conditions, they were not infallible, and could not always be relied upon.

Another example still influential today is from G. E. Moore, several of whose essays, such as the 1925 "A Defence of Common Sense", argued that individuals can make many types of statements about what they judge to be true, and that the individual and everyone else knows to be true. Michael Huemer has advocated an epistemic theory he calls phenomenal conservatism, which he claims to accord with common sense by way of internalist intuition.

=== Ethics ===
In twentieth-century philosophy the concept of the sensus communis as discussed by Vico and especially Kant became a major topic of philosophical discussion. The theme of this discussion questions how far the understanding of eloquent rhetorical discussion (in the case of Vico), or communally sensitive aesthetic tastes (in the case of Kant) can give a standard or model for political, ethical and legal discussion in a world where forms of relativism are commonly accepted, and serious dialogue between very different nations is essential. Some philosophers such as Jacques Rancière indeed take the lead from Jean-François Lyotard and refer to the "postmodern" condition as one where there is "dissensus communis".

Hannah Arendt adapted Kant's concept of sensus communis as a faculty of aesthetic judgement that imagines the judgements of others, into something relevant for political judgement. Thus she created a "Kantian" political philosophy, which, as she said herself, Kant did not write. She argued that there was often a banality to evil in the real world, for example in the case of someone like Adolf Eichmann, which consisted in a lack of sensus communis and thoughtfulness generally. Arendt and also Jürgen Habermas, who took a similar position concerning Kant's sensus communis, were criticised by Lyotard for their use of Kant's sensus communis as a standard for real political judgement. Lyotard also saw Kant's sensus communis as an important concept for understanding political judgement, not aiming at any consensus, but rather at a possibility of a "euphony" in "dis-sensus". Lyotard claimed that any attempt to impose any sensus communis in real politics would mean imposture by an empowered faction upon others.

In a parallel development, Antonio Gramsci, Benedetto Croce, and later Hans-Georg Gadamer took inspiration from Vico's understanding of common sense as a kind of wisdom of nations, going beyond the Cartesian method. It has been suggested that Gadamer's most well-known work, Truth and Method, can be read as an "extended meditation on the implications of Vico's defense of the rhetorical tradition in response to the nascent methodologism that ultimately dominated academic enquiry". In the case of Gadamer, this was in specific contrast to the sensus communis concept in Kant, which he felt (in agreement with Lyotard) could not be relevant to politics if used in its original sense.

Gadamer came into direct debate with his contemporary Habermas, the so-called Hermeneutikstreit. Habermas, with a self-declared Enlightenment "prejudice against prejudice" argued that if breaking free from the restraints of language is not the aim of dialectic, then social science will be dominated by whoever wins debates, and thus Gadamer's defense of sensus communis effectively defends traditional prejudices. Gadamer argued that being critical requires being critical of prejudices including the prejudice against prejudice. Some prejudices will be true. And Gadamer did not share Habermas' acceptance that aiming at going beyond language through method was not itself potentially dangerous. Furthermore, he insisted that because all understanding comes through language, hermeneutics has a claim to universality. As Gadamer wrote in the "Afterword" of Truth and Method, "I find it frighteningly unreal when people like Habermas ascribe to rhetoric a compulsory quality that one must reject in favor of unconstrained, rational dialogue".

Paul Ricoeur argued that Gadamer and Habermas were both right in part. As a hermeneutist like Gadamer he agreed with him about the problem of a lack of any perspective outside of history, pointing out that Habermas himself argued as someone coming from a particular tradition. He also agreed with Gadamer that hermeneutics is a "basic kind of knowing on which others rest". But he felt that Gadamer under-estimated the need for a dialectic that was critical and distanced, and attempting to go behind language.

A recent commentator on Vico, John D. Schaeffer has argued that Gadamer's approach to sensus communis exposed itself to the criticism of Habermas because it "privatized" it, removing it from a changing and oral community, following the Greek philosophers in rejecting true communal rhetoric, in favour of forcing the concept within a Socratic dialectic aimed at truth. Schaeffer claims that Vico's concept provides a third option to those of Habermas and Gadamer and he compares it to the recent philosophers Richard J. Bernstein, Bernard Williams, Richard Rorty, and Alasdair MacIntyre, and the recent theorist of rhetoric, Richard Lanham.

=== "Moral sense" as opposed to "rationality" ===
The other Enlightenment debate about common sense, concerning common sense as a term for an emotion or drive that is unselfish, also continues to be important in discussion of social science, and especially economics. The axiom that communities can be usefully modeled as a collection of self-interested individuals is a central assumption in much of modern mathematical economics, and mathematical economics has now come to be an influential tool of political decision-making.

While the term "common sense" had already become less commonly used as a term for the empathetic moral sentiments by the time of Adam Smith, debates continue about methodological individualism as something supposedly justified philosophically for methodological reasons (as argued for example by Milton Friedman and more recently by Gary S. Becker, both members of the so-called Chicago school of economics). As in the Enlightenment, this debate therefore continues to combine debates about not only what the individual motivations of people are, but also what can be known scientifically, and what should be usefully assumed for methodological reasons, even if the truth of the assumptions are strongly doubted. Economics and social science generally have been criticized as a refuge of Cartesian methodology. Hence, amongst critics of the methodological argument for assuming self-centeredness in economics are authors such as Deirdre McCloskey, who have taken their bearings from the above-mentioned philosophical debates involving Habermas, Gadamer, the anti-Cartesian Richard Rorty and others, arguing that trying to force economics to follow artificial methodological laws is bad, and it is better to recognize social science as driven by rhetoric.

== Catholic theology ==
Among Catholic theologians, writers such as theologian François Fénelon and philosopher Claude Buffier (1661–1737) gave an anti-Cartesian defense of common sense as a foundation for knowledge. Other Catholic theologians took up this approach, and attempts were made to combine this with more traditional Thomism, for example Jean-Marie de Lamennais. This was similar to the approach of Thomas Reid, who for example was a direct influence on Théodore Jouffroy. This meant basing knowledge upon something uncertain and irrational. Matteo Liberatore, seeking an approach more consistent with Aristotle and Aquinas, equated this foundational common sense with the koinaí dóxai of Aristotle, which corresponds to the communes conceptiones of Aquinas. In the twentieth century, this debate is especially associated with Étienne Gilson and Reginald Garrigou-Lagrange. Gilson pointed out that Liberatore's approach means categorizing such common beliefs as the existence of God or the immortality of the soul, under the same heading as (in Aristotle and Aquinas) such logical beliefs as that it is impossible for something to exist and not exist at the same time. This, according to Gilson, is going beyond the original meaning. Concerning Liberatore he wrote:

Endeavours of this sort always end in defeat. In order to confer a technical philosophical value upon the common sense of orators and moralists it is necessary either to accept Reid's common sense as a sort of unjustified and unjustifiable instinct, which will destroy Thomism, or to reduce it to the Thomist intellect and reason, which will result in its being suppressed as a specifically distinct faculty of knowledge. In short, there can be no middle ground between Reid and St. Thomas.

Gilson argued that Thomism avoided the problem of having to decide between Cartesian innate certainties and Reid's uncertain common sense, and that "as soon as the problem of the existence of the external world was presented in terms of common sense, Cartesianism was accepted".

== See also ==
- Axiom – Statement that is taken to be true
- Basic belief – Axioms under the epistemological view called foundationalism
- Common knowledge – Statement widely known to be true
- Commonsense reasoning – Branch of artificial intelligence aiming to create AI systems with "common sense"
  - Commonsense knowledge – Facts assumed to be known to all humans
- Conventional wisdom – Generally accepted ideas
- Counterintuitive
- Dunning–Kruger effect – Cognitive bias about one's own skill
- Phronesis – Ancient Greek word for a type of wisdom or intelligence
- Pre-theoretic belief – Topic in linguistics and philosophy
- Public opinion – Aggregate of individual attitudes or beliefs held by the adult population
- Social norm – Informal understanding of acceptable conduct

== Bibliography ==
- Aristotle, De Anima. The Loeb Classical Library edition of 1986 used the 1936 translation of W.S Hett, and the standardised Greek text of August Immanuel Bekker. The more recent translation by Joe Sachs (see below) attempts to be more literal.
- Brann, Eva (1991), The World of the Imagination: Sum and Substance, Rowman & Littlefield
- Bugter (1987), "Sensus Communis in the works of M. Tullius Cicero", in van Holthoon; Olson (eds.), Common Sense: The Foundations for Social Science, University Press of America, ISBN 9780819165046
- Descartes, Réné (1901), The Method, Meditations and Philosophy of Descartes, translated from the Original Texts, with a new introductory Essay, Historical and Critical by John Veitch and a Special Introduction by Frank Sewall, Washington: M. Walter Dunne
- Descartes, Rene (1970), "Letter to Mersenne, 21 April 1941", in Kenny, Anthony (ed.), Descartes: Philosophical Letters, Oxford University Press Translated by Anthony Kenny. Descartes discusses his use of the notion of common sense in the sixth meditation.
- Descartes, Rene (1989), Passions of the Soul, Hackett. Translated by Stephen H. Voss.
- Gadamer, Hans-Georg (1989), Truth and Method, translated by Joel Weinsheimer; Donald G. Marshall (2nd rev. ed.), New York: Continuum.
- Gilson, Etienne (1939), Thomist Realism and the Critique of Knowledge, Ignatius Press, ISBN 9781586176853
- Gregorić, Pavel (2007), Aristotle on the Common Sense, Oxford University Press, ISBN 9780191608490
- Heller-Roazen, Daniel (2008), Nichols; Kablitz; Calhoun (eds.), Rethinking the Medieval Senses, Johns Hopkins University Press, ISBN 9780801887369
- van Holthoon (1987), "The common sense of Rousseau", in van Holthoon; Olson (eds.), Common Sense: The Foundations for Social Science, University Press of America, ISBN 9780819165046
- van Holthoorn; Olson (1987), "Introduction", in van Holthoon; Olson (eds.), Common Sense: The Foundations for Social Science, University Press of America, ISBN 9780819165046
- Hume, David (1987), Essays Moral, Political, Literary, edited and with a Foreword, Notes, and Glossary by Eugene F. Miller, with an appendix of variant readings from the 1889 edition by T.H. Green and T.H. Grose, Indianapolis: Liberty Fund
- Hume, David (1902), Enquiries Concerning the Human Understanding and Concerning the Principles of Morals by David Hume, ed. L. A. Selby-Bigge, M.A. 2nd ed., Oxford: Clarendon Press
- Hundert (1987), "Enlightenment and the decay of common sense", in van Holthoon; Olson (eds.), Common Sense: The Foundations for Social Science, University Press of America, ISBN 9780819165046
- Kant, Immanuel (1914), "§ 40.: Of Taste as a kind of sensus communis", Kant's Critique of Judgement, translated with Introduction and Notes by J.H. Bernard (2nd ed. revised), London: Macmillan
- van Kessel (1987), "Common Sense between Bacon and Vico: Scepticism in England and Italy", in van Holthoon; Olson (eds.), Common Sense: The Foundations for Social Science, University Press of America, ISBN 9780819165046
- Lee, Mi-Kyoung (2011), "The distinction between primary and secondary qualities in ancient Greek philosophy", in Nolan, Lawrence (ed.), Primary and Secondary Qualities: The Historical and Ongoing Debate, Oxford, ISBN 978-0-19-955615-1
- Lewis, C. S. (1967), Studies in words, Cambridge: Cambridge University Press, ISBN 9780521398312
- Moore, George Edward (1925), A defense of common sense
- Oettinger, M. Friedrich Christoph. 1861. Cited in Gadamer (1989).
- Peters Agnew, Lois (2008), Outward, Visible Propriety: Stoic Philosophy and Eighteenth-century British Rhetorics, University of South Carolina Press, ISBN 9781570037672
- Reid, Thomas (1983), "An Inquiry into the Human Mind on the Principles of Common Sense", in Beanblosom; Lehrer (eds.), Thomas Reid's Inquiry and Essays, New York: Hackett
- Rosenfeld, Sophia (2011), Common Sense: A Political History, Harvard University Press, ISBN 9780674061286
- Sachs, Joe (2001), Aristotle's On the Soul and On Memory and Recollection, Green Lion Press, ISBN 978-1-888009-17-0
- Schaeffer (1990), Sensus Communis: Vico, Rhetoric, and the Limits of Relativism, Duke University Press, ISBN 978-0822310266
- Cooper, Anthony Ashley (2001), den Uyl, Douglas (ed.), Characteristicks of Men, Manners, Opinions, Times, Indianapolis: Liberty Fund
- Spruit, Leen (1994), Species Intelligibilis: From Perception to Knowledge. I. Classical roots and medieval discussions, Brill, ISBN 978-9004098831
- Spruit, Leen (1995), Species Intelligibilis: From Perception to Knowledge. II. Renaissance controversies, later scholasticism, and the elimination of the intelligible species in modern philosophy, Brill, ISBN 978-9004103962
- Stebbins, Robert A. Leisure's Legacy: Challenging the Common Sense View of Free Time. Basingstoke, UK: Palgrave Macmillan, 2017.
- Vico, Giambattista. On the Study Methods of our Time, trans. Elio Gianturco. Ithaca, NY: Cornell University Press, 1990.
- Vico, Giambattista (1968), The New Science of Giambattista Vico (3rd ed.), Cornell University Press. Translated by Bergin and Fisch.
- Voltaire (1901), "COMMON SENSE", The Works of Voltaire. A Contemporary Version. A Critique and Biography by John Morley, notes by Tobias Smollett, trans. William F. Fleming, vol. IV, New York: E.R. DuMont, archived from the original on 2016-03-22
- Wierzbicka, Anna (2010), Experience, Evidence, and Sense: The Hidden Cultural Legacy of English, Oxford University Press
