= Common Sense Party =

Common Sense Party may refer to:

- Common Sense (political party), Chile
- Party of Common Sense, Czech Republic
- Common Sense Party of California, U.S.
- Common Sense Party, a political party that participated in the 2021 Nassau County, New York Executive election, U.S.

== See also ==
- Common Sense Group, an informal group of Conservative MPs in the United Kingdom
- Common Sense Revolution, a political movement in Ontario, Canada
