= Richard A. Lanham =

American literary scholar

Richard Alan Lanham (born April 26, 1936) is an American literary scholar. He has written on writing style and rhetoric.

== Early life and education ==
Richard Alan Lanham was born on April 26, 1936, in Washington, D.C. He attended Yale University (AB, 1956; MA, 1960; PhD, 1963).

== Career ==
He is Professor Emeritus at the University of California, Los Angeles, and president of Rhetorica, Inc., a consulting firm. Lanham is a recognized expert in prose stylistics and Classical and Renaissance rhetoric. His Handlist of Rhetorical Terms (2nd ed., 1991) is the standard reference in the field, and he recently revised his Analyzing Prose (2nd ed., 2003), a benchmark work in stylistic analysis. Some other works are "The Motives of Eloquence: Literary Rhetoric in the Renaissance", Style: An Anti-Textbook, Literacy and the Survival of Humanism, and The Electronic Word: Democracy, Technology, and the Arts (1995). His Revising Prose and Revising Business Prose—now in revision—remain popular. His latest work, The Economics of Attention, was published in 2006 by the University of Chicago Press.

Long a champion of Sophistic rhetoric as a challenge and counterweight to Aristotle's model of rhetoric, in recent years Lanham has become interested in multimedia and the implications for rhetoric in this age of electronic text.

== "Q" question ==
In The Electronic Word: Democracy, Technology and the Arts, Lanham asks what he calls the "Q" question, named "Q" after Quintilian. The Q question asks whether there is a connection between studying literature or rhetoric makes people good.

Lanham identifies two defenses of the morality of rhetoric. The so-called weak defense (which Quintilian makes as well as Ramus) suggests that rhetoric is separate from philosophy and one first becomes a good person and then can add good speaking on top (158). More modern (and postmodern) theories contribute to Lanham's "Strong Defense" which "argues that, since truth comes to humankind in so many diverse and disagreeing forms, we cannot base a polity upon it. We must, instead, devise some system by which we can agree on a series of contingent operating premises" (187-8). The Strong Defense opposes the universal rational truth and suggests that "what links virtuosity, the love of form, and virtue, is virtu. power " (189).

== Economics of Attention ==
In his The Economics of Attention, Lanham points that human attention is one of the most scarce resources.

== Selected publications ==
- A Handlist of Rhetorical Terms: A Guide for Students of English Literature. University of California Press. 1968. ISBN 978-0-520-01414-5. OCLC 291918.
- The Motives of Eloquence: Literary Rhetoric in the Renaissance. Yale University Press. 1976.
- Style: An Anti-Textbook. Yale University Press. 1974. ISBN 978-0-300-01720-5. OCLC 915735.
- Revising Prose. Longman Pub Group, 1979.
- Analyzing Prose. Charles Scribner's Sons, 1983. 2nd Ed, Continuum, 2003.
- The Electronic Word: Democracy, Technology, and the Arts. University of Chicago Press. 1993. ISBN 978-0-226-46912-6. OCLC 646068363.
- The Economics of Attention: Style and Substance in the Age of Electronic Communication. University of Chicago Press. 2006.
- The Electronic Word: Democracy, Technology and the Arts. University of Chicago Press, 1993.
