= Common Sense (Scottish magazine) =

Scottish left-wing magazine

Common Sense was a magazine of left-wing theory published in Edinburgh, Scotland from 1987. It ceased publication in 1999. The creators of Common Sense aimed to be minimalist in its production.

Common Sense was the journal of the Edinburgh conference of Socialist Economics. The magazine produced articles along the lines of Open and Autonomist Marxism; its contents included articles from Italian leftists and some of John Holloway's earliest writings on the Zapatistas. It attempted to draw on the Common Sense school of Scottish Philosophy.

Well known leftist writers, like Holloway, Harry Cleaver, Toni Negri, George Caffentzis, Werner Bonefeld, and Richard Gunn wrote for the magazine. Holloway presented one essay he had contributed to the magazine at the Conference of Socialist Economics on 27 January 1990 on the topic of the Poll Tax.

The journal and the ideas it produced have influenced a number of later writers.
