= Sophia Rosenfeld =

American historian

Sophia Rosenfeld OPA
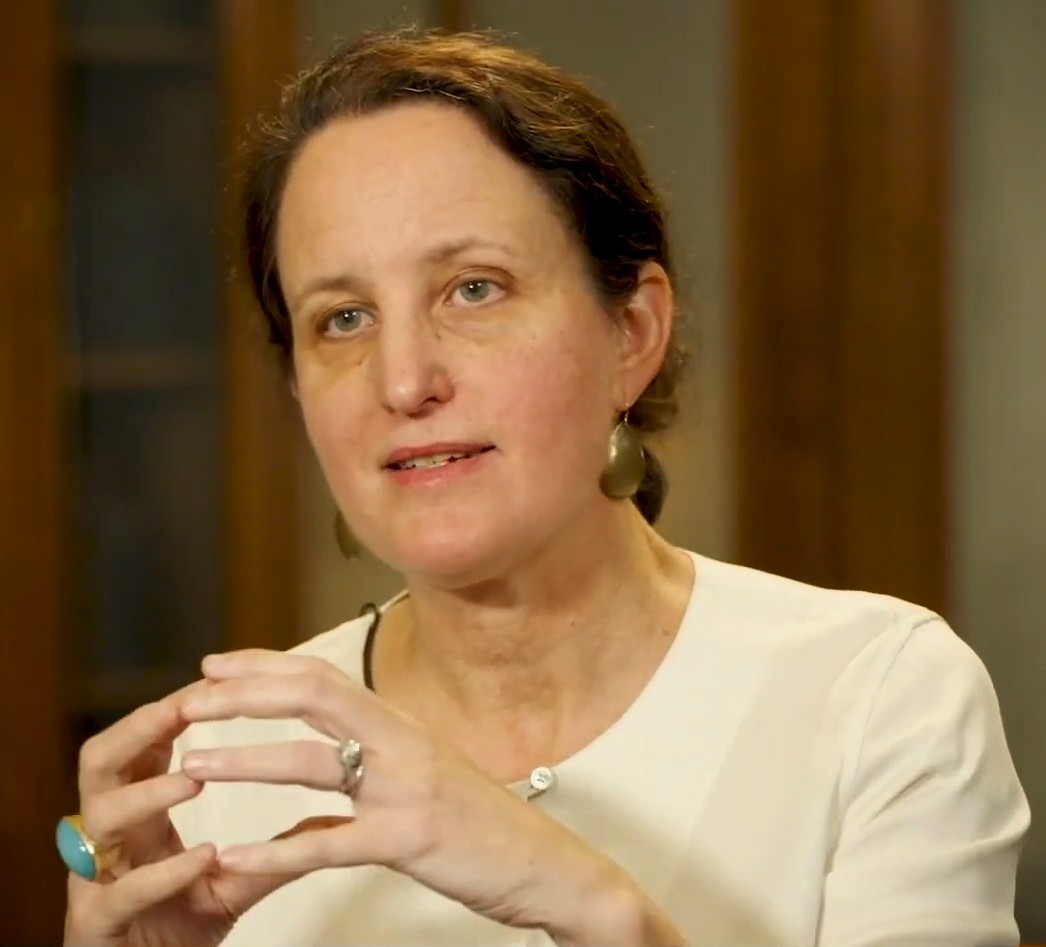
- Rosenfeld at the Library of Congress in 2023
- Born: 29 November 1966 (age 59)
- Occupations: Historian, academic
- Awards: Fellow of the American Academy of Arts and Sciences (2025); Ordre des Palmes Académiques (2022)

Academic background
- Education: Princeton University; Harvard University
- Website: Official website

Sophia Rosenfeld (born 29 November 1966) is an American historian. She specializes in European intellectual and cultural history with an emphasis on the Enlightenment, the trans-Atlantic Age of Revolutions, and the legacy of the eighteenth century for modern democracy. In 2017, she was named the Walter H. Annenberg Professor of History at the University of Pennsylvania.

== Life and career ==
Rosenfeld received her B.A. from Princeton University, and Ph.D. from Harvard University in 1996. Before coming to the University of Pennsylvania she taught at the University of Virginia and Yale University.

In 2014–2015, Rosenfeld was a Member at the Institute for Advanced Study, where she researched how the maximization of choice gradually developed across the Atlantic world into a proxy for freedom in human rights struggles and consumer culture. She also served a three-year term (from 2018 to 2021) as Vice President of the American Historical Association, where she was in charge of the Research Division.

In 2022, Rosenfeld held the Kluge Chair in Countries and Cultures of the North at the Library of Congress, and was named by the French government Officier dans l’Ordre des Palmes Académiques.

Rosenfeld's book Democracy and Truth was praised in the New Yorker's "Briefly Noted" book reviews: “Rosenfeld’s conclusion is sobering: even if the relationship between democracy and truth has long been vexed, the crisis facing Western democracies today is distinctly new.”

In 2025, Rosenfeld was elected to the American Academy of Arts and Sciences. Her book The Age of Choice: A History of Freedom in Modern Life was a finalist for the 2025 Cundill History Prize.

== Works ==
- The Age of Choice: A History of Freedom in Modern Life (Princeton University Press, 2025)
- Democracy and Truth: A Short History (University of Pennsylvania Press, 2019)
- Common Sense: A Political History (Harvard University Press, 2011; paperback 2014)
- A Revolution in Language: The Problem of Signs in Late Eighteenth-Century France (Stanford University Press, 2001; paperback 2004)
- A Cultural History of Ideas (6 volumes), Co-Editor with Peter Struck (Bloomsbury, 2023).
