= Common Sense: A Political History =

2011 book

Common Sense
- First edition
- Author: Sophia Rosenfeld
- Subject: Political history
- Publisher: Harvard University Press
- Publication date: 2011
- Pages: 337
- ISBN: 9780674057814

External videos
- The author on C-SPAN

Common Sense: A Political History is a book-length political history of "common sense" by Sophia Rosenfeld. It was published by Harvard University Press in 2011.
