= Aristotelian ethics =

Thoughts on how humans should best live

Aristotle first used the term ethics to name a field of study developed by his predecessors Socrates and Plato which is devoted to the attempt to provide a rational response to the question of how humans should best live. Aristotle regarded ethics and politics as two related but separate fields of study, since ethics examines the good of the individual, while politics examines the good of the city-state, which he considered to be the best type of community.

Aristotle's writings have been read more or less continuously since ancient times, and his ethical treatises in particular continue to influence philosophers working today. Aristotle emphasized the practical importance of developing excellence (virtue) of character (Greek ēthikē aretē), as the way to achieve what is finally more important, excellent conduct (Greek praxis). As Aristotle argues in Book II of the Nicomachean Ethics, the man who possesses character excellence will tend to do the right thing, at the right time, and in the right way. Bravery, and the correct regulation of one's bodily appetites, are examples of character excellence or virtue; so acting bravely and acting temperately are examples of excellent activities. The highest aims are living well, and eudaimonia – a Greek word often translated as well-being, happiness or "human flourishing". Like many ethicists, Aristotle regards excellent activity as pleasurable for the man of virtue. For example, Aristotle thinks that the man whose appetites are in the correct order takes pleasure in acting moderately.

Aristotle emphasized that virtue is practical, and that the purpose of ethics is to become good, not merely to know. Aristotle also claims that the right course of action depends upon the details of a particular situation, rather than being generated merely by applying a law. The type of wisdom which is required for this is called "prudence" or "practical wisdom" (Greek phronesis), as opposed to the wisdom of a theoretical philosopher (Greek sophia). But despite the importance of practical decision making, in the final analysis the original Aristotelian and Socratic answer to the question of how best to live, was, if possible, to live the life of philosophy.

== Three ethical treatises ==
Three Aristotelian ethical works survive today which are considered to be either by Aristotle, or from relatively soon after:

- Nicomachean Ethics, abbreviated as the NE or sometimes (from the Latin version of the name) as the EN, consisting of 10 books. The NE is the most widely read of Aristotle's ethical treatises.
- Eudemian Ethics, often abbreviated as the EE.
- Magna Moralia, often abbreviated as the MM.

The exact origins of these texts is unclear, although they were already considered the works of Aristotle in ancient times. Textual oddities suggest that they may not have been put in their current form by Aristotle himself. For example, Books IV–VI of Eudemian Ethics also appear as Books V–VII of Nicomachean Ethics. The authenticity of the Magna Moralia has been doubted, whereas almost no modern scholar doubts that Aristotle wrote the Nicomachean Ethics and the Eudemian Ethics himself, even if an editor also played some part in giving us those texts in their current forms.

The Nicomachean Ethics has received the most scholarly attention, and is the most easily available to modern readers in many different translations and editions. Some critics consider the Eudemian Ethics to be "less mature," while others, such as Kenny (1978), contend that the Eudemian Ethics is the more mature, and therefore later, work.

Traditionally it was believed that the Nicomachean Ethics and the Eudemian Ethics were either edited by or dedicated to Aristotle's son and pupil Nicomachus and his disciple Eudemus, respectively, although the works themselves do not explain the source of their names. On the other hand, Aristotle's father was also called Nicomachus. Aristotle's son was the next leader of Aristotle's school, the Lyceum, and in ancient times he was already associated with this work.

A fourth treatise, Aristotle's Politics, is often regarded as the sequel to the Ethics, in part because Aristotle closes the Nicomachean Ethics by saying that his ethical inquiry has laid the groundwork for an inquiry into political questions (NE X.1181b6-23). Aristotle's Ethics also states that the good of the individual is subordinate to the good of the city-state, or polis.

Fragments also survive from Aristotle's Protrepticus, another work which dealt with ethics.

== Aristotle as a Socratic ==
Aristotle's ethics builds upon earlier Greek thought, particularly that of his teacher Plato and Plato's teacher, Socrates. While Socrates left no written works, and Plato wrote dialogues and possibly a few letters, Aristotle wrote treatises in which he sets forth philosophical doctrines directly.

According to Aristotle in his Metaphysics, Socrates was the first Greek philosopher to concentrate on ethics, although he apparently did not give it this name, as a philosophical inquiry concerning how people should best live. Aristotle dealt with this same question but giving it two names, "the political" (or Politics) and "the ethical" (Ethics), with Politics being the more important part. The original Socratic questioning on ethics started at least partly as a response to sophism, which was a popular style of education and speech at the time. Sophism emphasized rhetoric, and argument, and therefore often involved criticism of traditional Greek religion and flirtation with moral relativism.

Aristotle's ethics, or study of character, is built around the premise that people should achieve an excellent character (a virtuous character, "ethikē aretē" in Greek) by practicing virtue in order to ultimately attain happiness or well-being (eudaimonia). It is sometimes referred to in comparison to later ethical theories as a "character based ethics". Like Plato and Socrates he emphasized the importance of reason for eudaimonia, and that there were logical and natural reasons for humans to behave virtuously, and try to become virtuous.

Aristotle's treatment of the subject is distinct in several ways from that found in Plato's Socratic dialogues.

- Aristotle's presentation is obviously different from Plato's because he does not write in dialogues, but in treatises. Apart from this difference, Aristotle explicitly stated that his presentation was different from Plato's because he started from whatever could be agreed upon by well brought-up gentlemen, and not from any attempt to develop a general theory of what makes anything good. He explained that it was necessary not to aim at too much accuracy at the starting point of any discussion to do with controversial matters such as those concerning what is just or what is beautiful. (From this starting point however, he built up to similar theoretical conclusions concerning the importance of intellectual virtue and a contemplative life.)
- Rather than discussing only four "cardinal virtues" of Plato (courage, temperance, justice, and prudence), all three of the ethical works start with courage and temperance as the two typical moral virtues which can be described as a mean, go on to discuss a whole range of minor virtues and vices which can be described as a mean, and only after that touch upon justice and the intellectual virtues. Aristotle places prudence (phronēsis, often translated as practical wisdom) amongst these intellectual virtues. (Nevertheless, like Plato he eventually says that all the highest forms of the moral virtues require each other, and all require intellectual virtue, and in effect that the most eudaimon and most virtuous life is that of a philosopher.)
- Aristotle's analysis of ethics makes use of his metaphysical theory of potentiality and actuality. He defines eudaimonia in terms of this theory as an actuality (energeia); the virtues which allow eudaimonia (and enjoyment of the best and most constant pleasures) are dynamic-but-stable dispositions (hexeis) which are developed through habituation; and this pleasure in turn is another actuality that complements the actuality of euidaimon living.

== Practical ethics ==
Aristotle believed that ethical knowledge is not only a theoretical knowledge, but rather that a person must have "experience of the actions in life" and have been "brought up in fine habits" to become good (NE 1095a3 and b5). For a person to become virtuous, he can't simply study what virtue is, but must actually do virtuous things.

We are not studying in order to know what virtue is, but to become good, for otherwise there would be no profit in it. (NE II.2)

== Aristotle's starting point ==
The Aristotelian Ethics all aim to begin with approximate but uncontroversial starting points. In the Nicomachean Ethics Aristotle says explicitly that one must begin with what is familiar to us, and "the that" or "the fact that" (NE I.1095b2-13). Ancient commentators agree that what Aristotle means here is that his treatise must rely upon practical, everyday knowledge of virtuous actions as the starting points of his inquiry, and that he is supposing that his readers have some kind of experience-based understanding of such actions, and that they value noble and just actions to at least some degree.

Elsewhere, Aristotle also seems to rely upon common conceptions of how the world works. In fact, some regard his ethical inquiries as using a method that relies upon popular opinion (his so-called "endoxic method" from the Grk. endoxa). There is some dispute, however, about exactly how such common conceptions fit into Aristotle's method in his ethical treatises, particularly since he also makes use of more formal arguments—especially the so-called "function argument"—which is described below.

Aristotle describes popular accounts about what kind of life would be a eudaimonic one by classifying them into three most common types: a life dedicated to pleasure; a life dedicated to fame and honor; and a life dedicated to contemplation (NE I.1095b17-19). To reach his own conclusion about the best life, however, Aristotle tries to isolate the function of humans. The argument he develops here is accordingly widely known as "the function argument," and is among the most-discussed arguments made by any ancient philosopher. He argues that while humans undergo nutrition and growth, so do other living things, and while humans are capable of perception, this is shared with animals (NE I.1098b22-1098a15). Thus neither of these characteristics is particular to humans. According to Aristotle, what remains and what is distinctively human is reason. Thus he concludes that the human function is some kind of excellent exercise of the intellect. And, since Aristotle thinks that practical wisdom rules over the character excellences, exercising such excellences is one way to exercise reason and thus fulfill the human function.

One common objection to Aristotle's function argument is that it uses descriptive or factual premises to derive conclusions about what is good. Such arguments are often thought to run afoul of the is-ought gap.

=== The highest good ===
In his ethical works, Aristotle describes eudaimonia as the highest human good. In Book I of the Nicomachean Ethics he goes on to identify eudaimonia as the excellent exercise of the intellect, leaving it open whether he means practical activity or intellectual activity. With respect to practical activity, in order to exercise any one of the practical excellences in the highest way, a person must possess all the others. Aristotle therefore describes several apparently different kinds of virtuous person as necessarily having all the moral virtues, excellences of character.

- Being of "great soul" (magnanimity), the virtue where someone would be truly deserving of the highest praise and have a correct attitude towards the honor this may involve. This is the first such case mentioned in the Nicomachean Ethics.
- Being just in the true sense. This is the type of justice or fairness of a good ruler in a good community.
- Phronesis or practical wisdom, as shown by good leaders.
- The virtue of being a truly good friend.
- Having the nobility kalokagathia of a gentleman.

Aristotle also says, for example in NE Book VI, that such a complete virtue requires intellectual virtue, not only practical virtue, but also theoretical wisdom. Such a virtuous person, if they can come into being, will choose the best life of all, which is the philosophical life of contemplation and speculation.

Aristotle claims that a human's highest functioning must include reasoning, being good at what sets humans apart from everything else. Or, as Aristotle explains it, "The function of man is activity of soul in accordance with reason, or at least not without reason." He identifies two different ways in which the soul can engage: reasoning (both practical and theoretical) and following reasoning. A person that does this is the best because they are fulfilling their purpose or nature as found in the rational soul, similar to how the best horse in a chariot race is the fastest horse etcetera.

(The wise person will) be more than human. A man will not live like that by virtue of his humanness, but by virtue of some divine thing within him. His activity is as superior to the activity of the other virtues as this divine thing is to his composite character. Now if mind is divine in comparison with man, the life of the mind is divine in comparison with mere human life. We should not follow popular advice and, being human, have only mortal thoughts, but should become immortal and do everything toward living the best in us. (NE 10.7)

In other words, the thinker is not only the 'best' person, but is also most like God.

== Moral virtue ==
Moral virtue, or excellence of character, is the disposition (Greek hexis) to act excellently, which a person develops partly as a result of his upbringing, and partly as a result of his habit of action. Aristotle develops his analysis of character in Book II of the Nicomachean Ethics, where he makes this argument that character arises from habit—likening ethical character to a skill that is acquired through practice, such as learning a musical instrument. In Book III of the Nicomachean Ethics, Aristotle argues that a person's character is voluntary, since it results from many individual actions which are under his voluntary control.

Aristotle distinguishes the disposition to feel emotions of a certain kind from virtue and vice. But such emotional dispositions may also lie at a mean between two extremes, and these are also to some extent a result of up-bringing and habituation. Two examples of such dispositions would be modesty, or a tendency to feel shame, which Aristotle discusses in NE IV.9; and righteous indignation (nemesis), which is a balanced feeling of sympathetic pain concerning the undeserved pleasures and pains of others. Exactly which habitual dispositions are virtues or vices and which only concern emotions, differs between the different works which have survived, but the basic examples are consistent, as is the basis for distinguishing them in principle.

Some people, despite intending to do the right thing, cannot act according to their own choice. For example, someone may choose to refrain from eating chocolate cake, but finds himself eating the cake contrary to his own choice. Such a failure to act in a way that is consistent with one's own decision is called "akrasia", and may be translated as weakness of will, incontinence, or lack of self-mastery.

=== Four cardinal virtues ===
1. Prudence, also known as practical wisdom, is the most personally important virtue for Aristotle. In war, soldiers must fight with prudence by making judgments through practical wisdom. This virtue is a must to obtain because courage requires judgments to be made.
2. Temperance, or self-control, simply means moderation. Soldiers must display moderation with their enjoyment while at war in the midst of violent activities. Temperance concerning courage gives one moderation in private which leads to moderation in public.
3. Courage is "moderation or observance of the mean with respect to feelings of fear and confidence". It "observes the mean with regard to things that excite confidence or fear" and sticks to a chosen course because it is noble to do so, or because it is disgraceful not to do so. Concerning warfare, Aristotle believes soldiers are morally significant and are military and political heroes. War is simply a stage for soldiers to display courage, and is the only way courage can be exemplified. Any other action by a human is simply the copying a soldier's ways; they are not actually courageous.
4. Justice means giving the enemy what is due to them in the proper ways; being just toward them. In other words, one must recognize what is good for the community and one must undertake a good course of action.

Vices of courage must also be identified which are cowardice and recklessness. Soldiers who are not prudent act with cowardice, and soldiers who do not have temperance act with recklessness. One should not be unjust toward their enemy no matter the circumstance. On another note, one becomes virtuous by first imitating another who exemplifies such virtuous characteristics, practicing such ways in their daily lives, turning those ways into customs and habits by performing them each and every day, and finally, connecting or uniting the four of them together.

Only soldiers can exemplify such virtues because war demands soldiers to exercise disciplined and firm virtues, but war does everything in its power to shatter the virtues it demands. Since virtues are very fragile, they must be practiced always, for if they are not practiced they will weaken and eventually disappear. One who is virtuous has to avoid the enemies of virtue which are indifference or persuasion that something should not be done, self-indulgence or persuasion that something can wait and does not need to be done at that moment, and despair or persuasion that something simply cannot be accomplished anyway. In order for one to be virtuous they must display prudence, temperance, courage, and justice; moreover, they have to display all four of them and not just one or two to be virtuous.

==== Justice ====
Aristotle devotes Book V of the Nicomachean Ethics to justice (this is also Book IV of the Eudemian Ethics). In this discussion, he defines justice as having two different but related senses, general justice and particular justice:

- general justice is virtue expressed in relation to other people. Thus the just man in this sense deals properly and fairly with others, and expresses his virtue in his dealings with them—not lying or cheating or taking from others what is owed to them.
- particular justice is the correct distribution of just deserts to others. For Aristotle, such justice is proportional: it has to do with people receiving what is proportionate to their merit or their worth.

In his discussion of particular justice, Aristotle says that an educated judge is needed to apply just decisions regarding any particular case. This is where we get the image of the scales of justice, the blindfolded judge symbolizing blind justice, balancing the scales, weighing all the evidence and deliberating each particular case individually.

== Intellectual virtue ==
Aristotle analyzed virtues into moral and intellectual virtues. Intellectual virtues are qualities of mind and character that promote intellectual flourishing, critical thinking, and the pursuit of truth. They include: intellectual responsibility, perseverance, open-mindedness, empathy, integrity, intellectual courage, confidence in reason, love of truth, intellectual humility, imaginativeness, curiosity, fair-mindedness, and autonomy. So-called virtue responsibilists conceive of intellectual virtues primarily as acquired character traits, such as intellectual conscientiousness and love of knowledge. Virtue reliabilists, by contrast, think of intellectual virtues more in terms of well-functioning mental faculties such as perception, memory, and intuition. Intellectual virtues are studied extensively in both critical thinking and virtue epistemology.

In the Posterior Analytics and Nicomachean Ethics he identified five intellectual virtues as the five ways the soul arrives at truth by affirmation or denial. These are then separated into three classes:

- Theoretical
  - Sophia – wisdom (rational intuition and scientific knowledge directed toward the highest and most valuable objects)
  - Episteme – scientific knowledge of objects that are necessary and unchanging
  - Nous – rational intuition of first principles or self-evident truths
- Practical
  - Phronesis – practical wisdom/prudence
- Productive
  - Techne – craft knowledge, art, skill

Subjacent intellectual virtues in Aristotle:

- Euboulia – deliberating well, deliberative excellence; thinking properly about the right end.
- Sunesis – understanding, sagacity, astuteness, consciousness of why something is as it is. For example, the understanding you have of why a situation is as it is, prior to having phronesis.
- Gnomê – judgement and consideration; allowing us to make equitable or fair decisions.
- Deinotes – cleverness; the ability to carry out actions so as to achieve a goal.

== Influence on later thinkers ==
Aristotle's writings were taught in the Academy in Athens until 529 CE when the Byzantine Emperor Justinian I closed down non-Christian schools of philosophy.

Aristotle's work however continued to be taught as a part of secular education. Aristotle's teachings spread through the Mediterranean and the Middle East, where some early Islamic regimes allowed rational philosophical descriptions of the natural world. Al-Farabi was a major influence in all medieval philosophy and wrote many works which included attempts to reconcile the ethical and political writings of Plato and Aristotle. Later Avicenna, and later still Averroes, were Islamic philosophers who commented on Aristotle as well as writing their own philosophy in Arabic. Averroes, a Muslim living in Europe, was particularly influential in turn upon European Christian philosophers, theologians and political thinkers.

In the twelfth century, Latin translations of Aristotle's works were made, enabling the Dominican priest Albert the Great and his pupil Thomas Aquinas to synthesize Aristotle's philosophy with Christian theology. Later the medieval church scholasticism in Western Europe insisted on Thomist views and suppressed non-Aristotelian metaphysics. Aquinas' writings are full of references to Aristotle, and he wrote a commentary on Aristotle's Nicomachean Ethics. Aquinas also departed from Aristotle in certain respects. In particular, his Summa Theologica argued that Eudaimonia or human flourishing was held to be a temporary goal for this life, but perfect happiness as the ultimate goal could only be attained in the next life by the virtuous. Aquinas also added new theological virtues to Aristotle's system: faith, hope and charity. And supernatural assistance could help people to achieve virtue. Nevertheless, much of Aristotle's ethical thought remained intact in Aquinas. Aristotle's ethics continued to be highly influential for many centuries. After the Reformation, Aristotle's Nicomachean Ethics was still the main authority for the discipline of ethics at Protestant universities until the late seventeenth century, with over fifty Protestant commentaries published on the Nicomachean Ethics before 1682.

In modern times, Aristotle's writings on ethics remain among the most influential in his broad corpus, along with The Rhetoric, and The Poetics, while his scientific writings tend to be viewed as of more strictly historical interest. Modern science develops theories about the physical world based on experiments and careful observation (e.g., on the basis of exact measurements of time and distance). Aristotle, on the other hand, bases his science largely on qualitative and non-experimental observation. Accordingly, he made some inaccurate claims which have been overturned—such as the claim that objects of different mass accelerate at different rates due to gravity.

On the other hand, The Nicomachean Ethics continues to be relevant to philosophers today. In fact, virtue ethics takes its inspiration from Aristotle's approach to ethics—in particular, sharing his emphasis on character excellence, and ethical psychology. Some philosophers, in particular Bernard Williams and Richard Clyde Taylor, regard Aristotle's ethics as superior to the Utilitarian and Kantian traditions, which have come to be the dominant approaches to philosophical ethics. Aristotle's well-known function argument is less commonly accepted today, since he seems to use it in order to develop a claim about human perfection from an observation from what is distinctive about man. But the exact role of the function argument in Aristotle's ethical theory is itself a matter of dispute.

== As listed in the Corpus Aristotelicum ==
Key: * / Authenticity disputed.; [ ] / Generally agreed to be spurious.
Bekker number	Work	Latin name
Ethics and politics
1094a	Nicomachean Ethics	Ethica Nicomachea
1181a	Great Ethics*	Magna Moralia*
1214a	Eudemian Ethics	Ethica Eudemia
1249a	[On Virtues and Vices]	[De Virtutibus et Vitiis Libellus]
1252a	Politics	Politica
1343a	Economics*	Oeconomica*

== See also ==
- Corpus Aristotelicum
- Economics (Oeconomica)
- Potentiality and actuality
- Ethics
- Eudaimonia
- Eudemian Ethics (Ethica Eudemia)
- Hexis
- Intellectual virtue
- Lesbian rule
- Magna Moralia (Great Ethics)
- Moral character
- Nous
- On Virtues and Vices (De Virtutibus et Vitiis Libellus)
- Phronesis
- Politics
- Protrepticus
- Summum bonum
- Virtue
- Virtue ethics
- Golden mean (philosophy)
