= Epistemic innocence =

Epistemic innocence is a psychological phenomenon that applies to epistemically costly and epistemically beneficial cognition. It determines the relationship between a cognition's psychological and epistemic benefits.

== Definition ==
It is defined as the epistemic status of faulty cognition that have epistemic costs as well as epistemic benefits.

== Description ==
A cognition that has an epistemic cost can also have an epistemic benefit that would have been unattainable with low epistemically costly means in epistemically innocent. Unrealistically optimistic beliefs, confabulatory explanations, delusions including motivated delusions, delusions in schizophrenia, delusions in depression, and inaccurate social cognition are examples of epistemic innocence. It does not fall into the category of epistemic goodness.

The framework determines the relationship between a cognition's psychological and epistemic benefits. These cognition can also be used to oppose views on delusion formation. The notion of epistemic is that false or irrational beliefs can be used despite failing to achieve accuracy or justification. It also contributes to a better understanding of a critical aspect of one's cognitive and epistemic lives.

The epistemic innocent cognition fill an explanatory gap that cannot be filled in any other condition. It maintains consistency between different beliefs of a subject and leads to acquisition and retention of true beliefs.

== Conditions ==
Two conditions make a cognition epistemic innocent; epistemic benefit and no alternatives. The first condition, epistemic benefit, governs a situation where the memory supports significant epistemic benefit to an agent. The second condition is when a less distorted memory when an epistemic benefit is not available.

=== Epistemic benefit ===
It includes the maximizing of the acquisition and retention of true beliefs, promotion of intellectual virtues, or avoiding epistemic blame.

=== No alternatives ===
It is a condition where there is no alternative to adopting a delusional belief due to the unavailability of supporting evidence. The unavailability can be of three types strictly unavailable, motivationally unavailable, or explanatorily unavailable.
