= Sophos (disambiguation) =

Sophos is a computer security developer.

Sophos may also refer to:

- Agathos kai sophos, a phrase used by Plato meaning "good and wise"
- Sage (philosophy) or sophos, a philosophical term for someone who has attained wisdom
