= Nicomachean Ethics =

Work on ethics by Aristotle

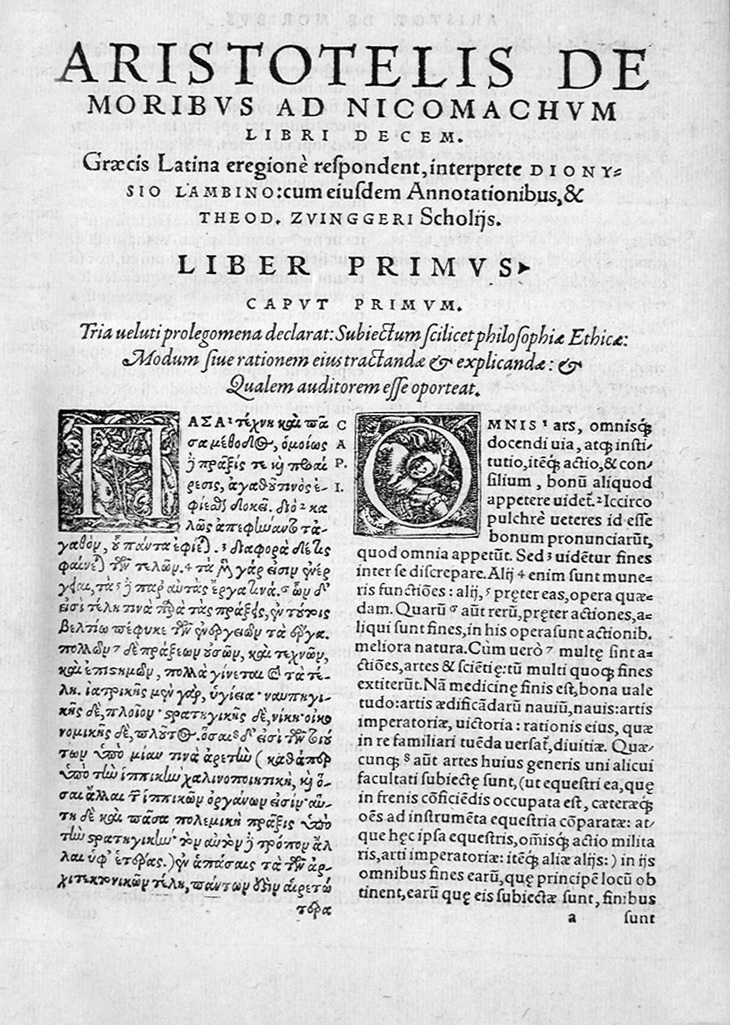
First page of a 1566 edition of the Aristotolic Ethics in Greek and Latin

The Nicomachean Ethics (/ˌnaɪkɒməˈkiən, ˌnɪ-/; Ancient Greek: Ἠθικὰ Νικομάχεια, Ēthika Nikomacheia) is Aristotle's best-known work on ethics: the philosophical study of the good for human life, that which is the goal or end at which all our actions aim. It consists of ten sections, referred to as books, and is closely related to Aristotle's Eudemian Ethics. The work is essential for the interpretation of Aristotelian ethics.

The text centers upon the question of how to best live, a theme previously explored in the works of Plato, Aristotle's friend and teacher. In Aristotle's Metaphysics, he describes how Socrates, the friend and teacher of Plato, turned philosophy to human questions, whereas pre-Socratic philosophy had only been theoretical and concerned with natural science. Ethics, Aristotle claimed, is practical rather than theoretical, in the Aristotelian senses of these terms. It is not merely an investigation into what good consists of, but it aims to be of practical help in achieving the good.

It is connected to another of Aristotle's practical works, Politics, which reflects a similar goal: for people to become good, through the creation and maintenance of social institutions. Ethics is about how individuals should best live, while politics adopts the perspective of a law-giver, looking at the good of a whole community.

The Nicomachean Ethics had an important influence on the European Middle Ages, and was one of the core works of medieval philosophy. As such, it was of great significance in the development of all modern philosophy as well as European law and theology. Aristotle became known as "the Philosopher" (for example, this is how he is referred to in the works of Thomas Aquinas). In the Middle Ages, a synthesis between Aristotelian ethics and Christian theology became widespread, as introduced by Albertus Magnus. The most important version of this synthesis was that of Thomas Aquinas. Other more "Averroist" Aristotelians such as Marsilius of Padua were also influential.

Until well into the seventeenth century, the Nicomachean Ethics was still widely regarded as the main authority for the discipline of ethics at Protestant universities, with over fifty Protestant commentaries published before 1682. During the seventeenth century, however, authors such as Francis Bacon and Thomas Hobbes argued that the medieval and Renaissance Aristotelian tradition in practical thinking was impeding philosophy.

Interest in Aristotle's ethics has been renewed by the virtue ethics revival. Recent philosophers in this field include Alasdair MacIntyre, G. E. M. Anscombe, Mortimer Adler, Hans-Georg Gadamer, and Martha Nussbaum.

== Title and abbreviations ==
The title is usually assumed to refer to Aristotle's son Nicomachus. One theory is that the work was dedicated to him, another is that it was edited by him (though he is believed to have died young, probably before he could have managed this alone). Another possibility is that the work was dedicated to Aristotle's father, who was also named Nicomachus. It is unlikely that it was dedicated by Aristotle himself, as it does not appear to be in a form Aristotle intended for publication. Rather it seems to be something like lecture notes meant for the lecturer or for consultation by students.

The oldest known reference to the Nicomachean Ethics by that title is in the works of Atticus (c. 175 CE), who also refers to the Eudemian Ethics by name.

In Greek the title is Ἠθικὰ Νικομάχεια (Ethica Nicomácheia), which is sometimes also given in the genitive form as Ἠθικῶν Νικομαχείων (Ethicôn Nicomacheíōn). The Latin version is Ethica Nicomachea or De Moribus ad Nicomachum.

=== Referencing ===
The Nicomachean Ethics is often abbreviated as NE or EN. Books and chapters are referred to with Roman and Arabic numerals respectively, along with corresponding Bekker numbers. For example, "NE II.2, 1103b1" means "Nicomachean Ethics, book II, chapter 2, Bekker page 1103, column b, line number 1". Chapter divisions, and the number of chapters in a book, are somewhat arbitrary and sometimes different compilers divide books into chapters differently.

== Background ==
Parts of the Nicomachean Ethics overlap with Aristotle's Eudemian Ethics: Books V, VI, and VII of the Nicomachean Ethics are identical to Books IV, V, and VI of the Eudemian Ethics. Opinions about the relationship between the two works differ. One suggestion is that three books from the Nicomachean Ethics were lost and subsequently replaced by three parallel works from the Eudemian Ethics, which would explain the overlap. Another is that both works were not put into their current form by Aristotle, but by an editor.

No consensus dates the composition of the Nicomachean Ethics. However, a reference in the text to a battle in the Third Sacred War in 353 BCE acts as a terminus post quem for that part of the work. The traditional position, held for example by W. D. Ross, is that the Nicomachean Ethics is a product of the last period of Aristotle's life, during his time in Athens from 335 BCE until his death in 322 BCE.

According to Strabo and Plutarch, after Aristotle's death, his library and writings went to Theophrastus (Aristotle's successor as head of the Lycaeum and the Peripatetic school). After the death of Theophrastus, the library went to Neleus of Scepsis.

The Kingdom of Pergamon conscripted books for a royal library, leading the heirs of Neleus to hide their collection in a cellar to prevent its seizure. The library remained there for about a century and a half, in conditions that were not ideal for document preservation. On the death of Attalus III, which also ended the royal library ambitions, the existence of the Aristotelian library was disclosed, and it was purchased by Apellicon and returned to Athens in about 100 BCE.

Apellicon sought to recover the texts, many of which were degraded by their time in the cellar. He had them copied into new manuscripts, and used his best guesswork to fill in the gaps where the originals were unreadable.

When Sulla seized Athens in 86 BCE, he seized the library and transferred it to Rome. There, Andronicus of Rhodes organized the texts into the first complete edition of Aristotle's works (and works attributed to him). These relics form the basis of present-day editions, including that of the Nicomachean Ethics.

Aspasius wrote a commentary on the Nicomachean Ethics in the early 2nd century CE. It suggests "that the text [at that time] was very like what it is now, with little or no difference, for instance, of order or arrangement, and with readings identical for the most part with those preserved in one or other of our best [extant manuscripts]." Aspasius noted "the existence of variants—which shows that there was some element of uncertainty as to the text even in this comparatively early stage in the history of the book."

The earliest known reference to the Nicomachean Ethics in the Islamic world appears in a letter by al-Kindī, titled Letter on the Number of the Books of Aristotle and What Is Needed to Acquire Philosophy (Risāla fī kammiyya kutub Arisṭūṭālīs wa-mā yuḥtāğ ilayhi fī taḥṣīl al-falsafa). In this work, al-Kindī enumerates the three Aristotelian treatises on ethics. However, scholars suggest it is probable that he did not have direct access to these texts himself, but was instead depending on a secondary Greek source.

The oldest surviving manuscript is the Codex Laurentianus LXXXI.11 (referred to as "K^{b}") which dates to the 10th century.

== Synopsis ==
Aristotle was the first philosopher to write ethical treatises, and begins by considering how to approach the subject. He argues that the correct approach for subjects like Ethics or Politics, which involve a discussion on beauty or justice, is to start by considering what would be roughly agreed to be true by people of good upbringing and substantial life experience, and then to work from those intuitions toward a more rigorous understanding. Over the course of the Ethics, Aristotle alternates between a theoretical/systematic approach to formalizing ethics and an empirical approach of consulting opinion, prior philosophical or literary works, and linguistic clues.

Aristotle's ethics is said to be teleological, in that it is based on an investigation into the telos, or end, of a human. In Aristotle's philosophy, the telos of a thing "can hardly be separated from the perfection of that thing", and "the final cause of anything becomes identical with the good of that thing, so that the end and the good become synonymous terms".

Taking this approach, Aristotle proposes that the highest good for humans is eudaimonia, a Greek word often translated as "flourishing" or sometimes "happiness". Aristotle argues that eudaimonia is a way of taking action (energeia) that is appropriate to the human "soul" (psuchē) at its most "excellent" or virtuous (aretē). Eudaimonia is the most "complete" aim that people can have, because they choose it for its own sake. An excellent human is one who is good at living life, who does so well and beautifully (kalos). Aristotle says such a person would also be a serious (spoudaios) human being. He also asserts that virtue for a human must involve reason in thought and speech (logos), as this is a task (ergon) of human living.

After proposing this ultimate end of human activity, Aristotle discusses what ethics means. Aristotelian Ethics is about how specific beneficial habits (virtues) enable a person to achieve eudaimonia and how to develop a virtuous character (ethikē aretē). He describes a sequence of necessary steps: The first step is to practice righteous actions, perhaps under the guidance of teachers, in order to develop good habits. Practiced habits form a stable character in which those habits become voluntary, which then achieves eudaimonia.

The Greek word ēthos, or "character", is related to modern words such as ethics and ethos. Aristotle does not equate character with habit (ethos in Greek, with a short "e") because character involves conscious choice. Instead, character is an hexis like health or knowledge—a stable disposition that must be maintained with effort. However, good habits are a precondition for good character.

Aristotle reviews specific ways in which people are thought worthy of praise or blame. He describes how the highest types of praise require having all the virtues, and these in turn imply more than good character, indeed a kind of wisdom.

(The Eudemian Ethics VIII.3 also uses the word "kalokagathia", the nobility of a gentleman (kalokagathos), to describe this same concept of a virtue encompassing all the moral virtues.)

The view that praiseworthy virtues in their highest form, even virtues such as courage, require intellectual virtue, is a theme Aristotle associates with Socrates; it is portrayed in the Socratic dialogues of Plato. Aristotle professes to work differently from Plato by trying to start with what well-brought up men would agree with, and to take a practical approach, but by Book VII Aristotle argues that the highest of virtues is not a practical one: wisdom. However, achieving wisdom requires all the virtues of character, or "moral virtues".

Aristotle's view that the highest good for man has both a practical and theoretical side is in the tradition of Socrates and Plato—but in opposition to pre-Socratic philosophy. As Ronna Burger points out: "The Ethics does not end at its apparent peak, identifying perfect happiness with the life devoted to theōria; instead it goes on to introduce the need for a study of legislation, on the grounds that it is not sufficient only to know about virtue, but one should try to put that knowledge to use." At the end of the book, according to Burger, the thoughtful reader is led to understand that "the end we are seeking is what we have been doing" while engaging with the Ethics.

=== Book I ===
Book I attempts to define the subject matter of ethics and justify his method for examining it. As part of this, Aristotle considers common-sense opinions along with those of poets and philosophers.

==== Who should study ethics, and how ====
Aristotle points out that "things that are beautiful and just, about which politics investigates, involve great disagreement and inconsistency, so that they are thought to belong only to convention and not to nature". For this reason Aristotle says we should not demand exacting rigor (akribeia), like we might expect from a mathematician, but rather look for answers about "things that are so for the most part". He claimed that people are satisfactory judges of such subjects after they become acquainted with them. However as the young (in age or in character) are inexperienced, they are less likely to benefit from this kind of study.

I.6 contains a famous digression in which Aristotle appears to question his "friends" who "introduced the forms". This refers to Plato and his school, and their Theory of Forms. Aristotle says that while both "the truth and one's friends" are loved, "it is a sacred thing to give the highest honor to the truth", signaling his belief that the Theory of Forms is not that. A Forms-based discussion of the Good might try to discover some characteristic that all good things have in common. Aristotle does not find this approach promising because the word "good" is used in too many ways. He says that while it is probably not coincidental that various things called good share that description, it is perhaps better to "let go for now" the quest for some common characteristic, as this "would be more at home in another type of philosophic inquiry": not helpful for discussing how people should act, in the same way that doctors do not need to philosophize over the definition of health in order to treat each case.

==== Defining eudaimonia and the aim of the Ethics ====
The opening passage asserts that all technical arts, all investigations (every methodos, including the Ethics itself), indeed all deliberate actions and choices, aim at some good apart from themselves. Many such goods are intermediate, desired only as means to higher goods.

Aristotle asserts that there is one highest good—eudaimonia (traditionally translated as "happiness" or "flourishing")—which is what good politics should target, because what is best for an individual is less beautiful (kalos) and divine (theios) than what is good for a people (ethnos) or community (polis). Politics organizes communal practical life, so the proper aim of politics should include the proper aim of all other pursuits, and "this end would be the human good (tanthrōpinon agathon)". The human good is a practical target, in contrast to Plato's references to "the Good itself". Aristotle concludes that ethics ("our investigation" or methodos) is "in a certain way political".

Aristotle then elaborates on the methodological concern with exactness. He claims that ethics, unlike some other types of philosophy, is inexact and uncertain. He says that it would be unreasonable to expect demonstrations of strict mathematical exactitude, but rather "each man judges correctly those matters with which he is acquainted".

Aristotle states that while most would agree to call the highest aim of humanity eudaimonia, and also to equate this with both living well and doing things well, disagreement about what this is persists between the majority (hoi polloi) and "the wise". He distinguishes three possible ways of life that people associate with happiness:

- the way of lavish pleasure
- the way of refined and active honorable politics
- the way of contemplation

Aristotle mentions two other possibilities that he argues can be discarded:

- passive virtue that suffers evils and misfortunes. Aristotle says no one would propose such a thing unless sacrificing to defend a shaky hypothesis (as Sachs points out, this is what Plato depicts Socrates doing in his Gorgias).
- money making, which Aristotle asserts is a life based on a merely intermediate good

Each commonly proposed happy way of life is a target that some people aim at for its own sake, just like they aim at happiness itself for its own sake. As for honor, pleasure, and intelligence (nous), as well as every virtue, though they lead to happiness, even if they did not we would still pursue them.

Happiness in life, therefore, includes the virtues, and Aristotle adds that it would include self-sufficiency (autarkeia)—not the self-sufficiency of a hermit, but of someone with a family, friends, and community—someone whose eudaimonia leaves them satisfied, lacking nothing.

To describe more clearly what happiness is like, Aristotle next asks what the work or function (ergon) of a human is. All living things have nutrition and growth as a work, all animals (according to Aristotle's definition of animal) have perception as part of their work, but what work is particularly human? The answer according to Aristotle is that it must involve reason (logos), including both being open to persuasion by reasoning, and thinking things through. Not only does human happiness involve reason, but is also an active being-at-work (energeia), not just a potential. And it is measured over a lifetime, because "one swallow does not make a spring". The definition given is therefore:

The Good of man is the active exercise of his soul's faculties in conformity with excellence or virtue, or if there be several human excellences or virtues, in conformity with the best and most perfect among them. Moreover, to be happy takes a complete lifetime; for one swallow does not make a spring.

— Rackham translation of I.7.1098a.

Because the good of a person is a work or function, just as we can contrast casual harpists with serious harpists, the person who lives well and beautifully in this actively rational and virtuous way will be a "serious" (spoudaios) person.

If happiness is virtue, or a certain virtue, then it must not just be a condition of being virtuous, potentially, but an actual way of virtuously "being at work" as a human. For as in the Ancient Olympic Games, "it is not the most beautiful or the strongest who are crowned, but those who compete". And such virtue will be good, beautiful, and pleasant; indeed Aristotle asserts that in most people different pleasures are in conflict with each other while "the things that are pleasant to those who are passionately devoted to what is beautiful are the things that are pleasant by nature and of this sort are actions in accordance with virtue". External goods are also necessary in such a virtuous life, because a person who lacks things such as good family and friends might find it difficult to be happy.

==== Questions that might be raised about the definition ====
Aristotle addresses some objections that might be raised against his proposed definition of eudaimonia.

First, he considers a Socratic question (found for example in Plato's Meno) of whether eudaimonia might be a result of learning or habit or training, or perhaps divine grace or random chance. Aristotle says that eudaimonia does result from some sort of learning or training. But, although not god-given, eudaimonia is one of the most divine things, and "for what is greatest and most beautiful to be left to chance would be too discordant".

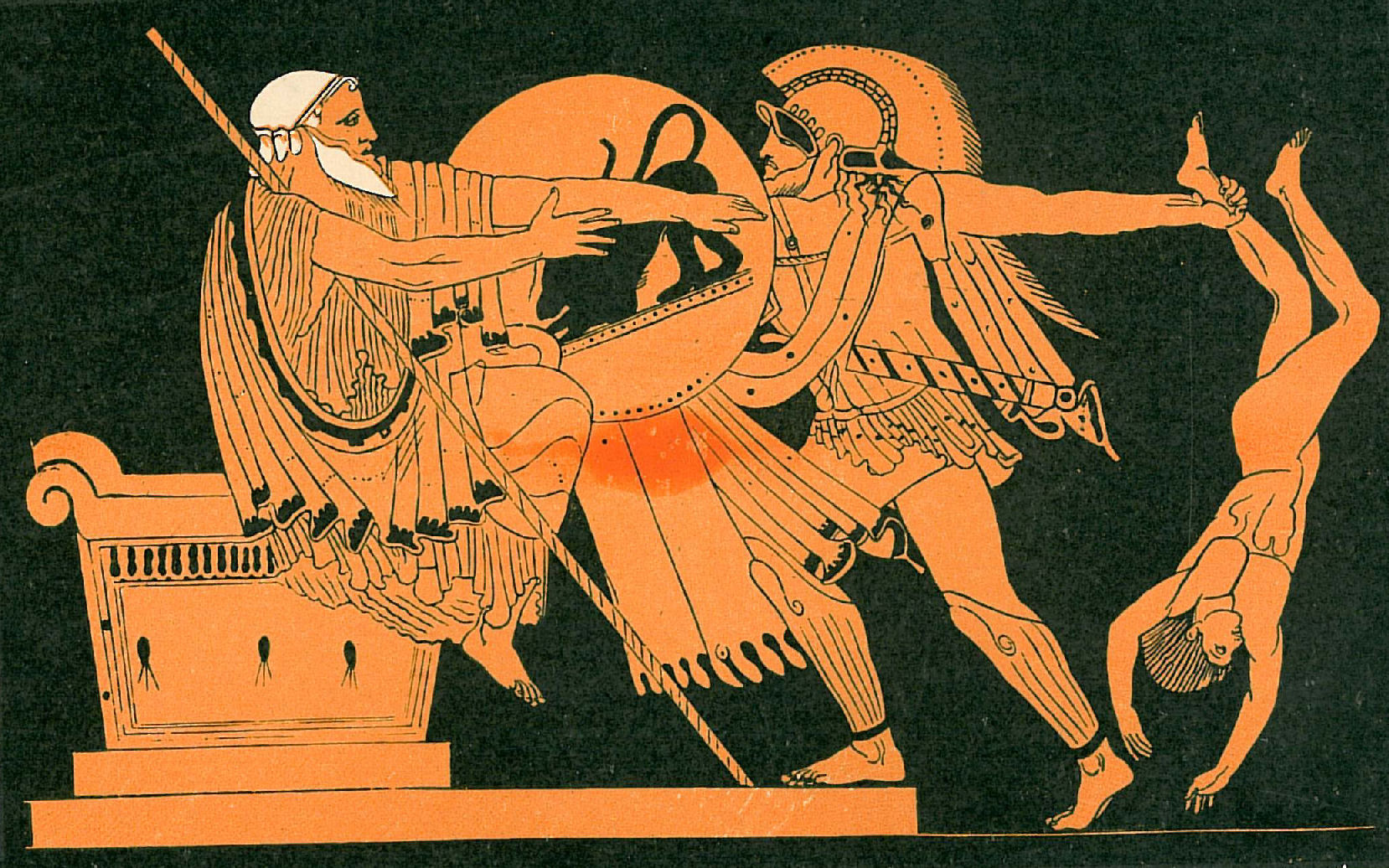
Neoptolemus killing Priam. Aristotle accepted that it would be wrong to call Priam unhappy only because his last years were unhappy.

Aristotle says eudaimonia must be considered over a lifetime, and it is possible that a person with a largely prosperous life is considered unhappy because of great reverses later in life. Aristotle uses the example Priam, the king of Troy, and says "no one calls a man happy who meets with misfortunes like Priam's, and comes to a miserable end".

Concerning the importance of chance to eudaimonia, Aristotle argues that a person at work in accordance with virtue "will bear with dignity whatever fortune sends, and will always make the best of his circumstances, as a good general will turn the forces at his command to the best account, and a good shoemaker will make the best shoe that can be made out of a given piece of leather, and so on with all other crafts". Only many great misfortunes will limit how blessed such a life can be, but "even in these circumstances something beautiful shines through".

Aristotle says that it "seems too unfeeling and contrary to people's opinions" to claim that the postmortem "fortunes of one's descendants and all one's friends have no influence at all" on one's eudaimonia. But he says it seems that if anything at all gets through to the deceased in this indirect way, whether good or bad, it would be something faint and small.

Aristotle distinguishes virtue and eudaimonia. Virtue, through which people "become apt at performing beautiful actions" is praiseworthy, while eudaimonia is something beyond praise: blessed, "since every one of us does everything else for the sake of this, and we set down the source and cause of good things as something honored and divine".

==== Introduction to the rest of the Ethics ====
Aristotle asserts that some things can be accepted about the soul (another reference to Plato), including the division of the soul into rational and irrational parts, and the further division of the irrational parts into two parts:

- one that is "not human" but "vegetative" and most at work during sleep, when virtue is least obvious
- another that is amenable to reason: "the faculty of appetite or of desire" in the soul that can comprehend and obey reason, much as a child can act "rationally" not by reasoning but by obeying a wise father.

The virtues then are similarly divided, into intellectual (dianoetic) virtues, and virtues of character concerning the irrational part of the soul that is amenable to reason.

This second set of virtues, "moral virtues" as they are often translated, are the central topic of Book II.

=== Books II–III: Concerning excellence of character, or moral virtue ===
Aristotle says that whereas intellectual virtue requires teaching, experience, and time, virtue of character comes about as a consequence of adopting good habits. Humans have a natural capacity to develop these virtues, but that training determines whether they actually develop.

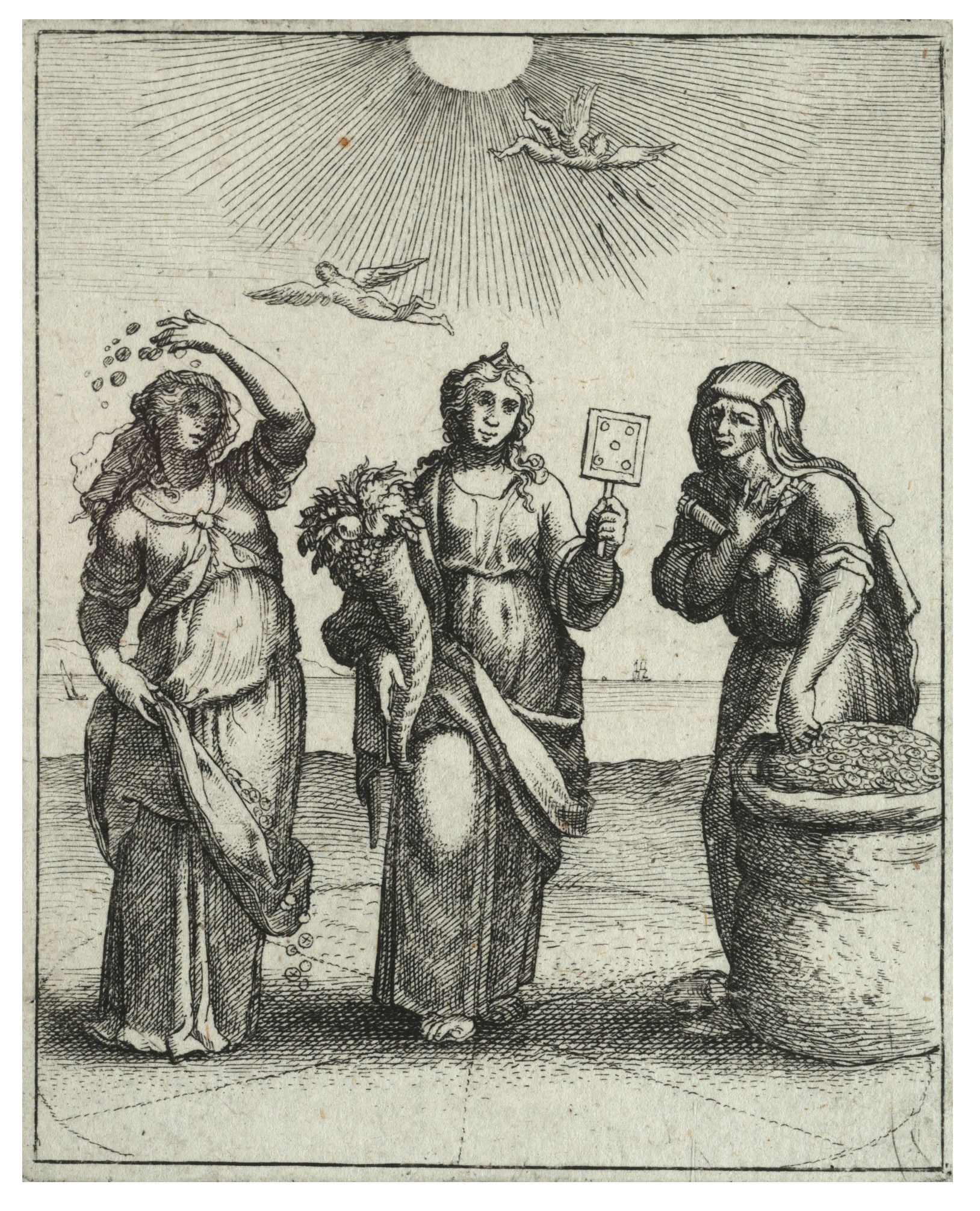
An allegory of the golden mean: a figure of moderation and prosperity between one of prodigality and another of miserliness

Aristotle says moral virtues are found at a mean (mesótēs) between deficiency and excess. For example, someone who flees is a coward (with a deficiency of bravery, or an excessive response to fear), while someone who fears nothing is rash (the opposite extreme). The virtue of courage is a "mean" between these two extremes. For this reason, Aristotle is considered a proponent of the golden mean doctrine. People first perform actions that are virtuous, possibly guided by teachers or experience; these habitual actions then become virtues when people characteristically choose such actions deliberately.

According to Aristotle, character, properly understood, is not just any tendency or habit but something that influences what causes pleasure or pain. A virtuous person feels pleasure when they perform the most beautiful or noble (kalos) actions; their practice of virtues and their pleasure therefore coincide. A person who is not virtuous, on the other hand, often finds pleasure to be misleading. For this reason, the study of virtue (or of politics) requires consideration of pleasure and pain.

It is not enough to perform virtuous actions by chance or by following advice. It is not like in the productive arts, where the product is judged as well-made or not. To be a virtuous person, one's virtuous actions must be

- done knowingly
- chosen for their own sakes
- chosen according to a stable disposition (not on a whim, or uncharacteristically).

Just knowing what would be virtuous is not enough.

According to Aristotle's analysis, the soul contains:

- feelings (pathos),
- faculties or capacities (dunamis),
- acquired habits (hexeis).

Virtues are hexeis—none of the other qualities of the soul are chosen, and none is praiseworthy in the way that virtue is.

As with the productive arts (technai), with virtues of character the focus must be on the making of a good human in a static sense, and on making a human that functions well as a human.

In II.7 Aristotle gives a list of character virtues and vices that he discusses in Books II and III. This list differs between the Nicomachean and Eudemian Ethics. He reiterates that it is not meant to be exhaustive.

Aristotle also mentions some "ways of observing the mean" that involve feelings or emotions: a sense of shame, for example, is sometimes praised, or said to be in excess or deficiency. Righteous indignation (nemesis) is a sort of mean between schadenfreude and envy. Aristotle says he intends to discuss such cases later, before the discussion of Justice in Book V. But the Nicomachean Ethics does not discuss righteous indignation there (which is however discussed in the Eudemian Ethics Book VIII).

Aristotle says that in practice people tend by nature towards the more pleasurable of the vicious extremes, and therefore to them the virtuous mean appears to be relatively closer to the less pleasant extreme. For this reason it is a good practice to steer toward the extreme that is less pleasant while one is hunting for the mean, which will help to correct for that tendency. However this rule of thumb is shown in later parts of the Ethics to apply mainly to some bodily pleasures, and Aristotle asserts it to be wrong as an accurate general rule in Book X.

==== Moral virtue as conscious choice ====
Aristotle begins by distinguishing human actions as voluntary & involuntary, and chosen & unchosen, and investigates what makes an action worthy of praise or blame, honor or punishment, and pardon or pity.

Aristotle divides wrong actions into three categories:

- Voluntary (ekousion) acts which are caused by a person's will or desire or choice.
- Involuntary or unwilling (akousion) acts, which are caused by some outside factor or by ignorance (for example the wind carries a person off, or a person has a wrong understanding of the particular facts of a situation).
- "Non-voluntary" or "non willing" actions (ouk ekousion) that are bad actions done by choice, but not deliberately, for example actions that are demanded from us under threat, or actions that are the lesser evil when no good actions are available. If one regrets a non-voluntary wrong action of this sort, it is effectively equivalent to an involuntary action for the purposes of assigning blame.

The two varieties of ignorance differ as to how they affect blame. Ignorance of what is good and bad is itself blameworthy—a sign of bad character. But once the difference is learned, misconceptions about some particular situation that leads to choosing the bad while thinking it good is excusable. Aristotle explains this in terms of syllogistic reasoning. Imagine a syllogism of this form: "It would be bad to serve poison to your father. This glass of wine has been poisoned. Therefore it would be bad to serve this glass of wine to your father." Serving the wine in ignorance of the first (universal) premise, but not the second, is depraved. Ignorance of the second (particular) premise, but not the first, is merely a mistake.

Aristotle defines and discusses several more critical terms:

- Deliberate choice (proairesis): "seems to determine one's character more than one's actions do". Things done on the spur of the moment, and things done by animals and children, can be willing, but driven by desire and spirit and not deliberate choice. Choice is rational and can be in opposition to desire. Choice always concerns realistic aims and available actions (which distinguishes it from "opinion" which can be about anything).
- Deliberation (bouleusis), at least for sane people, does not include theoretical contemplation about universals, nor about distant things, nor about things already precisely known, such stand or sit. "We deliberate about things that are up to us and are matters of action" and concerning things where it is unclear how they will turn out. Deliberation is therefore not about reasoning which ends to pursue (health, for example) but how to think through the means of achieving those ends. When desire (for an end) and deliberation (about the means) combine, a choice is born.
- Wishing (boulēsis) is something like deliberation, but focuses on ends rather than means. Contrary to some theories, Aristotle says that people do not wish for what is good by definition (though perhaps for what appears to be good). A worthy (spoudaios) person, however, does wish for what is "truly" good. Most people are misled by pleasure, "for it seems to them to be a good, though it is not".

Which things are appropriate topics of deliberation, based on an illustration in St. George Stock's Lectures in the Lyceum, or: Aristotle's Ethics for English Readers (1897)

Things
eternal and immutable	liable to change
periodic and invariable	not invariable
from necessity	from nature	spontaneous	depending on man
fortuitous	resulting from luck
depending on others	on ourselves

Virtue and vice according to Aristotle are "up to us". Although no one is willingly unhappy, vice, which leads to unhappiness, always involves chosen actions. Vice comes from bad habits and aiming at the wrong things, not from seeking to be unhappy.

Lawmakers are cognizant of these distinctions: they try to encourage or discourage various voluntary actions, but do not concern themselves with involuntary actions. They also tend not to be lenient towards people who act from negligent ignorance, for instance if they are drunk, ignorant about things that are easy to learn, or have allowed themselves to develop bad habits and a bad character. Though people with a bad character may be ignorant and even seem incapable of choosing right things, such a condition stems from decisions that were originally voluntary, similar to how poor health can develop from past choices—and, "While no one blames those who are ill-formed by nature, people do censure those who are that way through lack of exercise and neglect."

Aristotle then considers some specific character virtues, starting with two that concern "the irrational parts of the soul" (fear and desire): courage and temperance.

==== Courage ====
A virtue theory of courage
Concerned with	Mean	Excess	Deficiency
fear (phobos)	Courage (andreia): mean in fear and confidence	First Type: Foolhardy or excessive fearlessness; overindulges in fearful activities	Cowardly (deilos): excessive fear; deficient in confidence
confidence (thrasos)	Courage (andreia): mean in fear and confidence	Second Type: Rash (thrasus): excessive confidence	Cowardly (deilos): excessive fear; deficient in confidence

To have courage means to characteristically display appropriate confidence in the face of fearful situations. (However some fears are noble, like the fear of disgrace, and to be fearless in such a situation is something closer to shamelessness.) Courage usually refers to confidence and fear concerning man-made evils; it is exemplified by courage in the face of the most fear-laden thing, death, particularly death in battle. Aristotle says that fear of death is particularly pronounced in those who have lived a life that is both happy and virtuous—death is worse if the life it threatens is unusually good—and this may make courage ironically more difficult to achieve for people who otherwise are skilled in the virtues.

Everything humans do characteristically, that is, as a manifestation of some characteristic trait such as courage, is done for a purpose that is identical to the purpose of that trait. Any particular courageous act has the same aim (at least with respect to its courageousness) as the general trait of courageousness does. The aim of a particular act done courageously is not in the specific and incidental goals of the action, but in the service of the virtue of courageousness. A person develops courage once he or she sees courageousness as honorable, beautiful, and noble, as "a glory to human nature" as J.A. Stewart put it in his summary of this chapter.

People who have excessive fearlessness would be mad (Aristotle remarks that some describe Celts this way). Aristotle also says that "rash" people (thrasus), those with excessive confidence, are generally cowards putting on a brave face.

Aristotle notes that the term courage is sometimes misapplied to five other types of character:

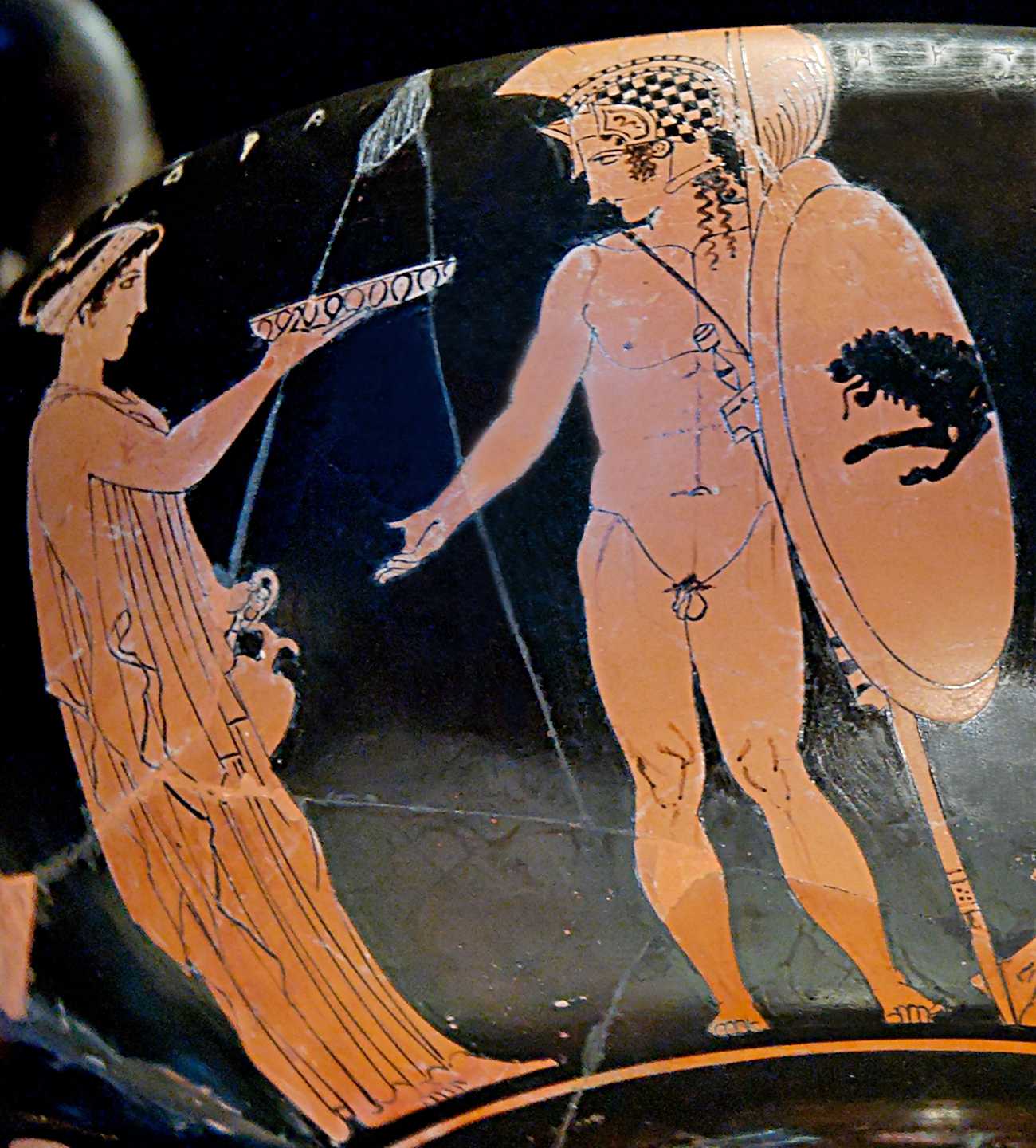
Hektor, the Trojan hero. Aristotle questions his courage.

- Citizen-soldiers who display a quasi-courage that is motivated by penalties for disobedience, by hope of honors, or by fear of shame when caught acting cowardly. Such motivations can make an army fight as if brave, but true courage is motivated by the love of virtue, not by external motives. Aristotle notes that Homeric heroes such as Hector had this type of courage.
- People who are experienced in dealing with some particular danger often seem courageous, though it is their skill rather than their courage which gives them confidence.
- Passion or anger (thumos) can look like courage. People who exhibit thumos can be blind to dangers, but unlike truly courageous people they do not aim at virtue. Aristotle notes however that this is "something akin to courage" and if it were combined with deliberate choice and purpose it would seem to be true courage.
- The boldness of someone who feels confident based on many past victories is not true courage. Like a person who is overconfident when drunk, this apparent courage is based on a lack of fear (not confidence in the face of fear), and will disappear if circumstances change.
- People who are overconfident simply due to ignorance of the danger can mimic courage.

Avoiding fear is more important when aiming at courage than avoiding overconfidence. As in the examples above, overconfident people are likely to be called courageous, or considered close to courageous. As Aristotle said in Book II, with moral virtues such as courage, the extreme one's normal desires tends away from is the best one to aim towards when trying to find the mean.

Courage leads people to risk pain, and therefore away from what they would more typically desire. The courageous person values courageous action more than they fear pain or even death.

Aristotle's treatment of this subject is often compared to Plato's. Courage was dealt with by Plato in Laches.

==== Temperance (sōphrosunē) ====
A virtue theory of temperance
Concerned with	Mean	Excess	Deficiency
pleasure (hēdonē) and pain (lupē)	Temperance (sōphrosunē)	insensibility (anaisthētos)	profligacy, dissipation, etc. (akolasia)

Temperance (Sophrosyne, also translated as soundness of mind, moderation, discretion) is a mean with regards to pleasure. The vice that occurs most often is excess in pursuit of pleasure (akolasia: licentiousness, intemperance, profligacy, dissipation, etc.). The vice of deficiency by contrast is so unusual that Aristotle calls people with it "almost imaginary characters" and cannot find a Greek word for that vice.

Pleasures are divided into those of the soul and those of the body. But those who are concerned with pleasures of the soul—honor or learning, for example—are not typically referred to as temperate or dissolute. Not all bodily pleasures are relevant, either; for example delighting in sights or sounds or smells are about temperance, unless it is a smell (food or perfume) that triggers yearning. Temperance and dissipation concern the animal-like, Aphrodisiac pleasures of touch and taste.

Some desires, like that of food and drink, or sex, are shared by all creatures. But such desires may manifest themselves variously. Desiring the wrong thing, desiring too much, or desiring in the wrong manner are all intemperate.

The temperate person desires things that are not impediments to health, not contrary to what is beautiful, nor beyond that person's resources. Such a person judges according to right reason (orthos logos).

Appetite is a form of pain; the intemperate are pained excessively about not getting bodily-touch pleasure. Temperate people are not so easily pained.

Intemperance is a more willingly chosen vice than cowardice, because it positively seeks pleasure, while cowardice avoids pain; pain can make it harder to exercise choice. For this reason intemperance is more criticized, because it should be easier to habituate so as to avoid it. In Greek, the word Aristotle uses for "intemperate" is the same one used for "unchastened", as in a spoiled child. Aristotle thinks this is apt, as temperance is about disciplining the needy child inside of us, so that appetites do not escape the control of reason.

=== Book IV: The second set of examples of moral virtues ===
The moral virtues discussed in Book IV concern behavior in social or political situations. Book IV is sometimes described as reflecting the norms of an Athenian gentleman in Aristotle's time. While this is consistent with the approach Aristotle said he would take in Book I, long-running disagreement concerns whether this was a framework for deriving more general conclusions, for example in Book VI, or whether it shows that Aristotle failed to generalize, and that his ethical thinking was parochial.

==== Liberality or generosity (eleutheriotēs) ====
A virtue theory of generosity
Concerned with	Mean	Excess	Deficiency
giving and getting (smaller amounts of) money	liberality, generosity, charity (eleutheriotēs)	prodigality, wastefulness, (asōtia)	meanness, stinginess, (aneleutheria)

This virtue concerns how people act with regards to donating/receiving money and things whose worth is valued in terms of money. The two extremes of deficiency and excess are wastefulness and stinginess, respectively.

Aristotle's approach to defining the correct balance is to treat money like any other useful thing, and say that virtue is to know how to use money: giving to the right people, in the right amount, at the right time. As with each of the ethical virtues, Aristotle emphasizes that a virtuous person is pleased to do the virtuous and beautiful thing.

It is better to err on the side of generosity: A liberal person "is more annoyed if he has not spent something that he ought than pained if he has spent something that he ought not".

Aristotle pointed out that we do not praise someone simply for not taking (which might however earn praise for being just). "[I]t is more characteristic of virtue... to do what is noble than not to do what is base." He also points out that "generous people are loved practically the most of those who are recognized for virtue, since they confer benefits".

Aristotle says the source of donated money is important: "a decent sort of taking goes along with a decent sort of giving". Profligate people are often wasteful and stingy at the same time; when trying to be generous they often take from the wrong sources (for example pimps, loan sharks, gamblers, thieves), and give to the wrong people. Such people can be helped by guidance, unlike stingy people (and most people are somewhat stingy). Stinginess is the opposite of generosity, "both because it is a greater evil than wastefulness, and because people go wrong more often with it than from the sort of wastefulness described".

==== Magnificence ====
A virtue theory of magnificence
Concerned with	Mean	Excess	Deficiency
giving and getting greater things	magnificence (megaloprepeia), munificence	tastelessness (apeirokalia), ostentation, vulgarity (banausia)	paltriness, chintziness, pettiness (mikroprepeia)

Magnificence is similar to generosity but concerns larger amounts. Aristotle says that while "the magnificent man is liberal, the liberal man is not necessarily magnificent".

The immoderate vices in this case concern "making a great display on the wrong occasions and in the wrong way". The extremes to be avoided in order to achieve this virtue are paltriness or chintziness on the one hand and vulgarity on the other.

Aristotle notes that moral dispositions (hexeis) are caused by activities (energeia), meaning that a magnificent person's virtue can be seen from the way he chooses to do magnificent acts at the right times.

Aristotle emphasizes the public nature of the giving—receiving foreign dignitaries, making religious offerings, erecting public buildings, funding festivals and entertainments, throwing weddings, lavishly decorating a home ("for even a house is a sort of public ornament").

Because he seeks spectacle, a person with this virtue does not focus on doing things cheaply, which would be petty, and may well overspend. As with liberality, Aristotle sees a potential conflict between some virtues and skill with money. He says that magnificence requires spending according to means, at least in the sense that poor men cannot be magnificent. The vices of paltriness and vulgar chintziness "do not bring serious discredit, since they are not injurious to others, nor are they excessively unseemly".

==== Magnanimity or "greatness of soul" ====
A virtue theory of magnanimity
Concerned with	Mean	Excess	Deficiency
great honor (timē) and dishonor	greatness of soul (megalopsuchia) (traditional translation: "magnanimity", or "pride")	vanity (chaunotēs)	smallness of soul (mikropsuchia), pusillanimity

Magnanimity is a Latinization of the Greek megalopsuchia, which means greatness of soul. Although the word has a connection to Aristotelian philosophy, it has a distinct meaning in English, which may confuse. Some modern translations refer to greatness of soul. The term implies not just greatness, but a person who correctly thinks themselves worthy of great things. Although that could imply vainglory, Aristotle defines it as a virtue. He says "not everybody who claims more than he deserves is vain" and indeed "most small-souled of all would seem to be the man who claims less than he deserves when his deserts are great".

Vanity, or small-souls, are the two extremes that fail to achieve the virtue of magnanimity. The small-souled person, according to Aristotle, "seems to have something bad about him".

To have the virtue of greatness of soul, and be worthy of what is greatest, one must possess greatness in all virtues. Sachs points out: "Greatness of soul is the first of four virtues that Aristotle will find to require the presence of all the virtues of character." The others are a type of justice, phronesis or practical judgment as shown by good leaders, and truly good friends. Aristotle views magnanimity as "a sort of adornment of the moral virtues; for it makes them greater, and it does not arise without them".

Aristotle considers what things are most worthy. Of external goods, the greatest is honor, because this is what we assign to gods, and this is what people of the highest standing target. Aristotle says that great-souled people do not pursue anything immoderately, including honor. Excellence and becoming worthy of honor is more important. (The haughty unconcern and disdain of a great-souled person, and his presumption and self-regard and the way he works to dominate others can make him seem arrogant, like an undeserving vain person.)

Leo Strauss proposes "a close kinship between Aristotle's justice and biblical justice, but Aristotle's magnanimity, which means a man's habitual claiming for himself great honors while he deserves these honors, is alien to the Bible".

Aristotle lists characteristics of the great-souled person:

- Deserves and claims great things, but above all, honor.
- Good in the highest degree, great in every virtue. He never behaves in a cowardly manner or wrongs another person, because, loving honor above all, lacks motive to do such things.
- Moderately pleased at receiving great honors from good people. Despises casual honors from middling people, however.
- Indifferent to what fate brings—"neither over-joyed by good fortune nor over-pained by evil" and cares not for power and wealth, except as a means to honor. Even honor, loved above all, does not consume him.
- It helps to be rich, powerful, and well-born, though none of those things are sufficient.
- Does not court danger (little that is worth courting danger). Confronts danger "unsparing of his life, knowing that there are conditions on which life is not worth having".
- Asks for nothing, but gives readily. Give benefits and gifts, but hates to receive them. Hates to be in another's debt, and overpays a debt to gain an advantage.
- Remembers (and likes to be reminded of) services to others, but not those received (which are reminders of having been in an inferior position).
- Projects dignity before people of high position and riches. Behaves in an unassuming manner towards common people, rejecting vulgar pomposity.
- Does not reach for common honors, only for the best ones. Few deeds, but those few are extraordinary.
- Speaks directly "except when he speaks in irony to the vulgar". Respects truth more than people's opinions, so does not hesitate to offer contempt and does not try to be tactful.
- Rejects service to a "superior", but may choose to serve a friend.
- Admires little, since to a great person, nothing else is particularly outstanding.
- Refuses to bear grudges or remember wrongs.
- Refuses to gossip or praise or demean others, rejecting typical motives to do so.
- Prefers to possess beautiful things of no particular use more than practical things.
- Moves slowly and deliberately, and speaks in a deep, level voice.
- He is definitely a male, though Aristotle does not think he needs to point this out explicitly.

==== A balanced ambitiousness concerning smaller honors ====
A virtue theory of ambitiousness
Concerned with	Mean	Excess	Deficiency
lesser honor (timē) and dishonor	laudable/proper ambition, industriousness	(Over-)ambitiousness (philotimos)	lack of ambition (aphilotimos)

In the same way that normal generosity was considered a scaled-down version of magnificence, Aristotle proposes two levels of virtue associated with honors, one concerned with great honors, Magnanimity or "greatness of soul" and another with ordinary honors. This latter virtue is a kind of correct respect for honor, which he said was at a mean between being ambitious (philotimos, honor-loving) and unambitious (aphilotimos, not honor-loving).

This virtue might be exhibited by a noble and manly person with appropriate ambition, or in a less ambitious person who is moderate and temperate. (There is no amount of virtuous philotimos.) To have the correct balance in this virtue means pursuing the right types of honor from the right sources of honor. In contrast, the glory hound craves accolades even from dubious sources and whether or not they are deserved, while the improperly unambitious man does not desire appropriately to be honored for noble reasons.

==== Gentleness (praótēs) concerning anger ====
A virtue theory of anger
Concerned with	Mean	Excess	Deficiency
anger (orgē)	gentleness (praotēs), good temper, patience	irascibility, irritability, (orgilotēs), wrathfulness	spiritlessness (aorgẽsia), slavishness

The virtue of praótēs is the correct mean concerning anger. Someone with the vice of excess, irascibility or quickness to anger, is angry at the wrong people, in the wrong manner, and so on. The vice of deficiency is found in people who refuse to defend themselves: milquetoasts, servile.

Aristotle does not deny anger a place in the behavior of a good person, but says it should be "on the right grounds and against the right persons, and also in the right manner and at the right moment and for the right length of time". Aristotle says it is not easy to behave according to the mean.

The virtue with regards to anger is not led by the emotions (pathoi), but by reason (logos). Anger can be virtuous and rational in the right circumstances, and a small amount of excess is not blameworthy, and might even be praised as "manly and fitted for command". It is better, however, to err on the side of forgiveness than anger; the person with a deficiency in this virtue, despite seeming foolish and servile, is closer to the virtue than someone who angers too easily.

==== Friendliness ====
A virtue theory of friendliness
Concerned with	Mean	Excess	Deficiency
general pleasantness in society	friendliness, amiability (something like philia)	First type: obsequious (areskos), if for no purpose	quarrelsome (duseris) and surly (duskolos), churlish, peevish
general pleasantness in society	friendliness, amiability (something like philia)	Second type: flattering, fawning (kolax), if for own advantage	quarrelsome (duseris) and surly (duskolos), churlish, peevish

Another virtue concerns interaction with others. An obsequious (areskos) person is overly concerned with pleasing others, backing down too easily, even when it is dishonorable or harmful to do so. A surly (duskolos) or quarrelsome (dusteris) person objects to everything and does not care what pain they cause others. No specific Greek word names the correct virtuous mean, but Aristotle says it resembles friendship (philia). The difference is that this friendly virtue concerns behavior towards friends and strangers alike, and does not involve friends' emotional bond. (Concerning true friendship see books VIII and IX.)

According to Aristotle, getting this virtue right also involves:

- Dealing appropriately with different types of people, for example people in a higher social position than oneself, or people more or less familiar to you.
- Sometimes sharing in the pleasure of companions at some expense, if this pleasure is not harmful or dishonorable.
- Willingness to experience pain in the short term for longer-run pleasure of a greater scale.

He describes flattery as a sort of cunning obsequiousness practiced to gain advantage.

==== Honesty about oneself: the virtue between boasting and self-deprecation ====
A virtue theory of truthfulness
Concerned with	Mean	Excess	Deficiency
truth (alēthēs), representation	truthfulness, sincerity, straightforwardness (alētheia)	boastfulness, exaggeration, swagger (alazoneia)	self-deprecation, false modesty (eironia, same word as "irony")

Aristotle is concerned with a specific type of honesty: self-representation. (Other types of honesty might involve virtues such as justice.)

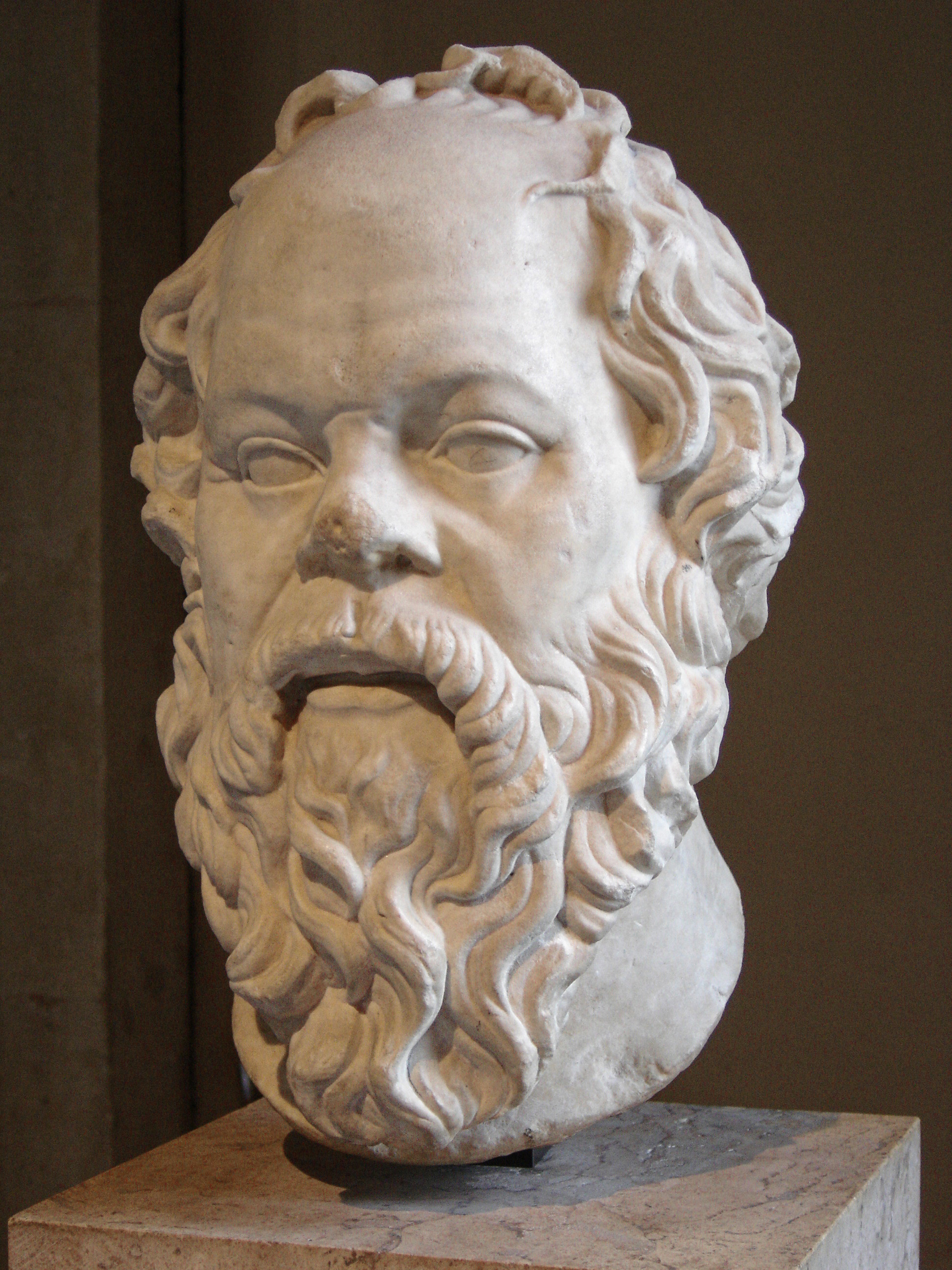
Socrates used irony, which Aristotle considers a peccadillo. But some philosophers brag dishonestly, which is worse.

Aristotle said that no convenient Greek word names the virtuous and honest mean, describing someone who claims his good qualities without exaggeration or understatement. The vice of excess is boastfulness; that of deficiency is self-deprecation. As in the previous case concerning obsequiousness and flattery, vices concerned with self-representation might be part of one's character, or they might be performed as if they were in character, but really with some ulterior motive.

As in many of these examples, Aristotle says the vice of excess (boastfulness) is more blameworthy than that of deficiency (self-deprecation).

Aristotle says a person might be relatively blameless if they are occasionally dishonest about their own qualities, as long as this does not become a fixed disposition. Specifically, boasting is not very blameworthy if the aim is honor or glory, but is if the aim is money.

Parts of this section critique Aristotle's practice of philosophy. At one point he says that examples of areas where dishonest boasting for gain might go undetected, and be very blameworthy, would be prophecy, philosophy, or medicine, all of which have both pretense and bragging. This appears to be a criticism of contemporary sophists. But one of the words for the vices under discussion, self-deprecation (Greek eirôneia, from which English "irony"), was and is used to describe the philosophical technique of Socrates. Aristotle specifically mentions Socrates as an example, writing "For they seem to be avoiding bombast, not looking for profit, in what they say. The qualities that win reputation are the ones that these people especially disavow, as Socrates also used to do." But at the same time he notes that although the vice of deficiency is often less blameworthy, it is still a moral deficiency.

==== Wit and charm ====
A virtue theory of wittiness
Concerned with	Mean	Excess	Deficiency
pleasantness and social amusement	wittiness, charming, (eutrapelos), jocularity, urbanity, geniality	buffoonery, vulgarity, frivolity (bõmolochia)	boorishness, sourness (bõmolochos)

The virtue of wit, charm, and tact, and generally saying the right things when speaking playfully, Aristotle said is a necessary part of life. In contrast a buffoon can never resist making any joke, and the deficient vice in this case is an uncultivated person who does not get jokes, and is useless in playful conversation. He doubts the existence of rules about playful discourse, so a person with this virtue will tend to be "a law unto himself".

==== Shame (quasi-virtue) ====
The sense of shame is not a virtue, but more like a feeling than a stable character trait (hexis). Shame derives from voluntary acts, and a decent person does not voluntarily act shamefully, so a sense of shame fits awkwardly into a scheme of virtues, though shamelessness is certainly a vice.

In youth, shame is attractive, since young people are expected to make mistakes because of their inexperience, and responding to these mistakes with appropriate shame is praiseworthy. In adults, shame is not admirable.

=== Book V: Justice and fairness ===
Book V is the same as Book IV of the Eudemian Ethics; the first of three books common to both works. It represents the discussion on justice (dikaiosunē) foreseen in earlier books, which covers some of the same material as Plato's Republic, though in a strikingly different way.

Burger points out that although the chapter nominally follows the same path (methodos) as previous chapters "it is far from obvious how justice is to be understood as a disposition in relation to a passion: the proposed candidate, greed (pleonexia), would seem to refer, rather, to the vice of injustice and the single opposite of the virtue." In other words, justice is not described as a mean between two extremes.

He distinguishes such states-of-character from "science". A science concerns a subject matter in which knowledge and skill aim for opposite extremes: for example, a doctor knows the science of health, and uses this knowledge to heal or possibly harm patients. A state-of-character, on the other hand, goes in only one direction—having a courageous state-of-character does not make it easier for one to be cowardly, nor vice versa. Justice, he says, is a state of character that is possessed by people who engage in just acts from just desires, not merely the science of knowing theoretically about just outcomes or processes.

Aristotle claims that people use the word "just" to mean either "law abiding" or lawful (nominos), or equitable or fair (isos). He envisions an ideal legal system in which "all that is unfair is unlawful, but not all that is unlawful is unfair ... [and] the law bids us practise every virtue and forbids us to practise any vice." But: "It would seem that to be a good man is not in every case the same thing as to be a good citizen." These two common meanings of justice coincide only to the extent that the laws are themselves good, something only lawmakers can ensure.

Aristotle says that a complete virtue encompasses all types of justice and indeed all types of excellence of character, while a partial virtue is distinct from other character traits. For example, a soldier who flees in battle might be exhibiting cowardice, but could also be exhibiting a sort of injustice (e.g., not wanting to equally share risks with other soldiers).

To understand how justice aims at what is good, it is necessary to look beyond particular good or bad things, and this includes considering the viewpoint of a community (the subject of Aristotle's Politics). Alone of the virtues justice looks like "someone else's good", an argument also confronted by Plato in his Republic.

Concerning areas in which law-abiding behavior might conflict with fairness, Aristotle says that this is part of Politics. Aristotle divides particular justice further into two parts: distribution of divisible goods, and rectification in private transactions. The first relates to members of a community in which it is possible for one person to have more or less of a good than another person. The second concerns transactions that have resulted in an imbalance. This part is itself divided into two parts: voluntary and involuntary. Involuntary is divided into furtive and violent divisions.

Justice in the City	Justice in the Soul contrast V.11 (1138b5–13) and Plato's Republic IV (443b–d)
General Sense; The just = the lawful •V.1 (1129b12–14): lawful things are in a sense just things •V.9 (1137a11–12): lawful things are only by accident just things	Particular Sense just = equal V.2 (1130b30–1131a1)
Distributive Justice; Geometric proportion: •equal shares for equals; •unequal for unequals; •different in different regimes	Corrective Justice; Arithmetic proportion: subtract unjust gain of one party, to make up for loss by the other party
Voluntary transactions	Involuntary transactions V.2 (1131a2–9)
selling buying lending at interest giving security for a loan investing depositing renting	Furtive theft adultery poisoning (pharmakeia) procuring (proagōgeia) enticement of slaves assassination by treachery false witness	By force assault imprisonment murder seizure, rape maiming verbal abuse slanderous insult

Aristotle says that justice involves the allocation of shares of goods in a way that concerns "at least four terms, namely, two persons for whom it is just and two shares which are just". The just must fall between what is too much and what is too little, and what is just requires consideration not just for equality but for the relative political standing of the parties.

How to judge the mean is not clear, because "if the persons are not equal, they will not have equal shares; it is when equals possess or are allotted unequal shares, or persons not equal equal shares, that quarrels and complaints arise".

Aristotle does not state how to decide who deserves more or less. Political systems variously define "fair share". Democrats think that citizens should have equal shares, and others a lesser share. Others (believers in oligarchy, aristocracy, etc.) think that shares ought to be proportionate to wealth, fortune of birth, or honor. Distributive justice then allocates goods according to that rule, so that if persons A and B stand in a ratio A:B by the accepted standard, shares of the good should be divvied out in a ratio C:D so that (A+C):(B+D) = A:B; in other words, so that in divvying up the goods the relative status of A and B is respected.

The second part of particular justice is restorative; it concerns voluntary and involuntary transactions between people and looks to remediate harm (βέβλαπται) caused to an individual. Emphasizing justice as a mean, he says that "men require a judge to be a middle term or medium—indeed in some places judges are called mediators—for they think that if they get the mean they will get what is just. Thus the just is a sort of mean, inasmuch as the judge is a medium between the litigants." To restore both parties to this just mean, a judge must redistribute the value so that both have the mean. This rule rectifies both voluntary and involuntary transactions.

Finally, Aristotle turns to the idea that retaliation ("an eye for an eye") is justice, an idea he associates with the Pythagoreans. One problem with this approach is that it ignores different reasons for committing a crime. For example, a crime of passion or ignorance rather than from defective character, which makes a critical difference when determining the just action. Another problem is that it does not preserve the original proportions of the parties involved: "an eye for an eye" is blindly equal in its application and does not respect the status of the parties prior to the transgression. For example: "if an officer strikes a man, it is wrong for the man to strike him back; and if a man strikes an officer, it is not enough for the officer to strike him, but he ought to be punished as well".

Aristotle mentions that what is legal is not the same as what is just: "Political Justice is of two kinds, one natural, the other conventional." Aristotle makes a point that recalls debates from Plato's Republic: "Some people think that all rules of justice are merely conventional, because whereas a law of nature is immutable and has the same validity everywhere, as fire burns both here and in Persia, rules of justice are seen to vary." Aristotle insists that justice is fixed in one sense, and variable in another: "the rules of justice ordained not by nature but by man are not the same in all places, since forms of government are not the same, though in all places there is only one form of government that is natural, namely, the best form". He claimed people can generally see which types of rules are conventional and which natural—and he felt that most important when trying to judge whether someone was just or unjust was determining whether they did something voluntarily. Harmful acts can be categorized as:

- accidental – from ignorance of the nature of the act, that cause an unforeseeable harm
- mistaken – from ignorance of the nature of the act, that cause a foreseeable injury, but that do not imply vice
- unjust – with knowledge of the nature of the act (therefore voluntary), but not premeditated (e.g., done from passion)
- viciously unjust – both voluntary and chosen

The discussion of voluntary acts in this section and that in Book III are not consistent. In this section, Aristotle calls acts done in and from ignorance varieties of involuntary acts; in Book III he says such acts are not involuntary, except for those that both were done from ignorance and were then regretted.

Aristotle next discusses epieikeia (usually translated as "equity"), which is a skillful, nuanced corrective to by-the-books justice.

==== Chapter 5 – Currency ====
In chapter five, Aristotle gives his theory for the origin of currency as a medium of exchange. He begins from an assumption that in voluntary economic transactions, the people in the transaction begin with a certain relative proportion of goods, and end with the same relative proportion of goods. If this does not occur—if the proportion goes out of balance during the transaction—some injustice has occurred. A problem with this is that it is difficult for people to exchange things that are actually equal such that they preserve this proportion: imagine a cobbler trying to exchange shoes for a house, for example. Clearly no house-builder is going to accept a single pair of shoes in trade or a pile of shoes (as unwieldy and impractical). Money exists, says Aristotle, so that both parties in a transaction can weigh their contributions on a common scale. But how does a cobbler, for instance, know how to value their product on this scale? Aristotle says that the key to determining this quantitative measure of value is chreia. This has often been translated as "demand" by translators eager to suggest that Aristotle anticipated the modern supply and demand theory of price, but could also be translated as "use", "advantage", or "service".

=== Book VI: Intellectual virtues ===
Book VI of the Nicomachean Ethics is identical to Book V of the Eudemian Ethics.

If a virtue is the habit of deliberately choosing a virtuous mean, how is that mean identified? And how is that translated into action—how does knowledge become choice?

Recognizing the mean means recognizing the correct boundary-marker (horos) that defines the frontier of the mean. So practical ethics (having a good character) requires knowledge.

Aristotle divides the soul (psuchē) into two main parts: the rational part and the irrational part. The rational part of the soul is the part that possesses and uses the faculty of reason to contemplate over the invariable and variable. The irrational part is split into two halves. One half is the vegetative portion responsible for nutrition and growth. The second half is the appetitive portion, which when correctly controlled by the rational part of the soul, results in moral virtue. He has so far discussed the type of virtue or excellence (aretē) of the appetitive, non-reasonable part—that of the character (ēthos, the virtue of which is ēthikē aretē, moral virtue). Now he intends to discuss the other type: that of thought (dianoia).

The part of the soul with reason is divided into two parts:

- one concerning things with invariable causes
- one concerning variable things and deliberation about actions

Choice happens when an end desired by the appetitive part of the soul combines with a discovery of means by the intellectual part of the soul. Both parts of the soul are equal partners in this; describing it as the desire enlisting the intellect or the intellect guiding the desire is a matter of convention.

Aristotle says that if recognition depends upon likeness and kinship between the things being recognized and the recognizing parts of the soul, then the soul grows naturally in two parts.

Aristotle enumerates five types of hexis (stable dispositions) of the soul and that can disclose truth:

Intellectual Virtues
hexis	description	scope	truth
Knowledge (Episteme)	Concerns truths reachable by induction or by syllogism. Knowledge is demonstrable: the logical path can always be described.	invariable, eternal things	abstract methods
Art (Techne)	Involves making things deliberately, in a way that can be explained—things that require the artist's talent. Art concerns things that could be one way or another, and it concerns intermediate rather than ultimate aims (for example: a house is built not for its own sake, but to have a place to live).	variable things	productive
Practical Judgement (Phronesis)	Decides overall actions well, not merely specific acts of making as in techne, but according to the aim of living well. Aristotle associates this virtue with politics. He distinguishes skilled deliberation from knowledge, because things we already know need no deliberation. It is also distinct from guessing or learning, because true consideration is always a type of inquiry and reasoning.	variable things	practical
Intellect (Nous)	The capacity to develop, with experience, to grasp the sources of knowledge and truth. Unlike knowledge (episteme), it deals with truths that cannot be derived: the "first principles" from which knowledge derives. Nous is not a type of reasoning, but a perception of the universals that can be derived from particular cases, including the aims of practical actions. Nous therefore supplies phronēsis with its aims, without which phronēsis would just be the "natural virtue" (aretē phusikē) called cleverness (deinotēs).	invariable/eternal things	abstract principles
Wisdom (Sophia)	Belongs to the wise, who are unusual. Aristotle describes wisdom as a combination of nous and episteme ("knowledge with its head on"). Wisdom also has some resemblance to the moral virtues, in the sense that it can become a permanent and characteristic faculty.	variable things	abstract, impractical

==== Practical judgement (phronesis) ====
The closing chapters of Book VI examine phronesis (practical judgement, practical wisdom, or prudence) more closely.

Phronesis concerns practical matters, and matters that can be meaningfully influenced by human effort. Syllogistic reasoning is important to this variety of reasoning: one must be able to know the truth about the universal, the particular, and the syllogistic process that enables one to draw a conclusion from such truths.

Phronesis has subcategories for different spheres of human life:

- prudence – for practical wisdom about governing yourself
- domestic management – for practical wisdom about home economics
- legislation – for practical wisdom about politics
- deliberative and judicial government for practical wisdom about the execution of political principles

People who apply practical wisdom to themselves and their homes are esteemed as wise, but people who apply their wisdom to other people's lives are considered meddlesome. Aristotle believes that such busybodies are nonetheless important to the health of the polis.

Phronesis seems to require experience; it is unlike mathematics that a talented child learns. Aristotle thinks this is because expertise in mathematics requires an understanding of abstract universals, while practical wisdom requires encounters with real-life particulars. A savant can grasp a mathematical truth immediately; but may be skeptical about a truth of practical wisdom and to need to see that truth exemplified in real-life examples before adopting it.

Practical wisdom also concerns intuitively-grasped particulars (somewhat resembling nous, which is intuition about universals). For example, recognizing a triangle without having to count the sides and add up the angles is using practical wisdom in this way.

People with practical wisdom deliberate well. Deliberation is a sort of inquiry into what would be a good course of action. It is not:

- scientific knowledge (which is invariable/eternal and so not amenable to deliberation)
- clever guessing, just so stories, or facile wit (deliberation is more careful)
- truth (knowledge can be true or false, but deliberation is better or worse)
- correctness (having the correct opinion is a conclusion, not a deliberation)
- good reasoning toward bad ends (such as a clever but intemperate person might do)
- true conclusions arrived at through mistaken logic
- true conclusions arrived at through unnecessarily cumbersome logical tangles
- good reasoning toward ends that are good, but not all that good; not good enough to contribute to eudaimonia.

Understanding is like deliberation, but is meant to comprehend the nature of a thing or situation (which can then aid in deliberation). Understanding aids evaluating the knowledge or choices of others.

Gnome is notoriously difficult to translate. It is a deeper, holistic understanding of a situation. In particular, it is what allows a person to add epieikeia to their virtue of Justice.

Aristotle uses Nous in a different sense to tie understanding, deliberation, and gnome together. This use of Nous is understanding, deliberation, and gnome that is integrated and practiced. It aids in identifying the relevant aspects of a situation and the relevant hypotheses that enable best decisions. This is a skill that can only be acquired through experience, and is how elders earn their reputation for wisdom.

Aristotle ends his investigation by comparing the importance of practical wisdom (phronesis) and philosophical wisdom (sophia). Although Aristotle describes sophia as the more serious (it is concerned with higher things), he mentions the earlier philosophers, Anaxagoras and Thales, as examples proving that one can be wise, having both knowledge and intellect, and yet lack practical judgement. He describes the dependency of sophia upon phronesis as like the dependency of health upon medical knowledge. Wisdom is aimed at for its own sake, like health, a necessary component of that most complete virtue, happiness.

Aristotle closes by arguing that in their highest form, virtues all exist together.

=== Book VII: Impediments to virtue ===
This book is Book VI in Eudemian Ethics. It extends previously developed discussions, especially from the end of Book II, in relation to the vice of akolasia and the virtue of sophrosune.

This book shows signs of having been cobbled together from multiple fragmentary sources; it is repetitive.

Aristotle lists three impediments to virtue:

Impediments and Their Opposites
Bad State	Description	Its Opposite
vice, intemperance, wickedness (kakia)	like the virtue of temperance, vice is a stable disposition (hexis) "knowingly and deliberately chosen".	virtue, temperance, goodness
incontinence, imperfect self-control, weakness, self-indulgence (akrasia)	the opposite of self-control; unlike vice, incontinence is a weakness in which someone follows an urge rather than making a deliberate choice.	continence, self-control, self-command, manliness, self-restraint
brutishness, brutality, beastly depravity, ferocity, savagery (thēriotēs)	the opposite of something more than human, something heroic or god-like such as Homer attributes to Hector. (Aristotle notes that these terms beast-like and god-like are strictly speaking only for humans, because real beasts or gods would not have virtue or vice.)	superhuman virtue, heroic virtue, godlike virtue, heroism, heroic temperament, heroic greatness

These stand in a sort of hierarchy:

- heroic greatness (near-divine)
- virtue (habitually good, not badly tempted in the first place)
- continence (habitually capable of resisting temptation)
- endurance (able to resist temptation for sufficient reward)
- passion (sometimes overcome by anger or other very strong emotion)
- incontinence (often overcome by mere desire)
- vice (habitually bad)
- brutishness (nearly subhuman)

==== Self-control and hedonism ====
According to Aristotle, self-control and akrasia (incontinence) are not "identical with Virtue and Vice, nor yet as different in kind from them". Temperance is distinct from self-control, both because self-control could be used to restrain good desires as much as bad ones, and because a temperate person would not have bad desires that need restraining.

Another way of stating the difference between lack of self control and intemperance is that intemperance is a choice and a habit of character—an exercise of the will—while incontinence is contrary to choice—a failure of will. By analogy, the incontinent person is like a city that has good laws on the books but that does not enforce them; the intemperate person is like a city with bad laws.

Aristotle reviews notions about self-control, including one he associates with Socrates. According to Aristotle, Socrates argued that incontinent behavior must be a result of ignorance, as people only choose what they think to be good: it is not that the unrestrained person does things that they know to be bad, disregarding their knowledge under the influence of passion, but that they are ignorant about what is good and bad. Aristotle says at first that "this view plainly contradicts the observed facts", but comes to conclude that "the position that Socrates sought to establish actually seems to result".

His way of accommodating Socrates relies on syllogistic reasoning. Aristotle suggests that an incontinent person has competing universal premises, for example "χ would be unjust" and "χ would satisfy my sensual desire." When they then encounter a particular "α is an example of χ" the universal premise that has a sensual payoff associated with it crowds out the one that does not when it comes time for the incontinent person to choose a course of action ("α would satisfy my sensual desire" ∴ "I shall α!"). The incontinent person therefore remains in ignorance about what they should be able to know ("α would be unjust").

Aristotle says that someone who lacks self-control is typically influenced either by "necessary" pleasures or pains, like those associated with food and sex, or by more supererogatory pleasures and pains like those associated with victory, honor, or wealth. Lack of self-control in the first case is simple lack of self-control, and is a sort of vice (in a similar domain to intemperance). Lack of self-control in the second case is somewhat different: pursuing good things, but in an excessive, unrestrained way.

Some have unusual desires or aversions after they were victimized as children or experience some sort of psychopathology or other malady. Aristotle says that "every sort of senselessness or cowardice or dissipation or harshness that goes to excess is either animal-like or disease-like".

For Aristotle, akrasia ("incontinence"), is distinct from animal-like behavior because it is specific to humans and involves rational thinking, even though the conclusions are not put into practice. Someone who behaves in a purely animal-like way is not acting based upon conscious choice.

Returning to the question of anger (thumos), Aristotle distinguishes it from desires because he says it listens to reason, but often hears incorrectly. He contrasts this with desire, which does not listen to reason. Someone overcome by anger is conquered by flawed, crude reason, but at least by an argument; someone overcome by desire is conquered by desire alone. He also says that anger is more natural and less blameworthy than desire for excessive unnecessary pleasure. Acts from anger are more likely to be sudden and unpremeditated, while those motivated by desire are more likely to be plotted. Furthermore, acts of hubris never result from anger, but always have a connection to pleasure-seeking, whereas angry people act from often-regretted pain.

The two ways that people lose mastery of their own actions and do not act according to their own deliberations include excitability, where a person does follows their imagination, and that of a weak person who has thought things through, but is carried away by passion. Nevertheless, it is better to have akrasia than the vice of akolasia, in which intemperate acts are chosen for their own sake. People with such a vice do not even know they are wrong, and feel no regrets. These are less curable.

Aristotle compares self-control (resisting the temptation of the pleasant) with endurance (resisting the temptation of the unpleasant), and he describes the nebbish (who wilts in the face of moderate displeasure) as a sort of counterpart to the person without self control.

Finally Aristotle addresses questions raised earlier:

- Not everyone who stands firm has self-control. Stubborn people are more like a person without self-control, because they are partly led by the pleasure that comes from exhibiting confident decisiveness or by avoiding the pain of admitting a mistake.
- Not everyone who fails to stand firm has a true lack of self-control. Aristotle gives the example of Neoptolemus (in Sophocles' Philoctetes) who feels honor-bound both to lie to Philoctetes for the sake of Odysseus, and not to lie for the sake of remaining an honest person.
- A person with practical judgment (phronesis) cannot have akrasia. It might sometimes seem so, but only in the sense that a clever person can sometimes recite words that make them sound wise, like an actor or a drunk reciting poetry. A person lacking self-control can have knowledge, but not an active knowledge that they pay attention to.

==== Hedonism and pleasure ====
Aristotle discusses pleasure in two separate parts of the Nicomachean Ethics (VII.11–14 and X.1–5). Plato discussed similar themes in several dialogues, including the Republic and the Philebus and Gorgias.

He begins this section by rebutting the arguments of Speusippus who opposed the idea that pleasure is a (or the) good.

Speusippus's Arguments Against Pleasure Being Good
Speusippus	Aristotle
Good and pleasure are different sorts of things: pleasure is a sort of activity; but a good is an end, not an activity.	"Unimpeded activity" is one way to define pleasure, but it is also, though an activity (energeia), also a sort of end.
Temperate people avoid pleasures; but virtuous people (temperance is a virtue) don't shun what is good. Practical wisdom teaches us how to avoid pain, not how to pursue pleasure. Children and brutes pursue pleasure, so pleasure is not the sort of ultimate end only refined people know to pursue.	Some pleasures are good without qualification; others can be good or bad contingently. Children and brutes pursue the latter sort without the benefit of practical wisdom; the temperate person knows to avoid those pleasures that can disrupt self-control and other types of excess, but even the temperate person has pleasures. Everybody—virtuous people, brutes, and children—pursues pleasure, so there must be something to it. People who pursue base pleasures may not have the wrong idea about the good, but may mistake evil for good.
Pleasures interfere with rational thinking.	While some pleasures impede rational thought, others accompany rational thought.
Every good is a product of some art, but there is no "art" of pleasure.	Arts concern the creation of artifacts; pleasure is a sort of activity. So, an art not an activity. But is it really true that every good must be an artifact? (And perhaps the arts of the perfumer or the gourmet are examples of arts of pleasure after all.)
Some pleasures are "actually base and objects of reproach".	"[I]f certain pleasures are bad, that does not prevent the chief good from being some pleasure, just as the chief good may be some form of knowledge though certain kinds of knowledge are bad." When we say an intemperate person is bad for pursuing pleasures, we don't mean that the pleasures themselves aren't good, but that the intemperate person is pursuing them excessively or in the wrong way.
There are harmful, unhealthy pleasures.	It is a logical fallacy to say that because some pleasant things are unhealthy, pleasures must not be good. It is like saying because some healthy things are expensive, healthy things must not be good. If a pleasure is unhealthy it is bad at promoting health, but this does not mean it is simply bad.

According to Aristotle's way of analyzing causation, a good or bad thing can either be an activity (energeia) or a stable disposition (hexis). The pleasure that comes from returning to a natural hexis are accidental and not natural, for example the temporary pleasure that can come from a bitter taste. Things that are pleasant by nature are activities that are pleasant in themselves and involve no pain or desire. The example Aristotle gives is contemplation. Such pleasures are activities that are ends themselves, not just processes of coming into being aimed at some higher end.

Pain is clearly bad, either in a simple sense or as an impediment. Aristotle argues that this makes it clear that pleasure is good. He rejects the argument of Speusippus that pleasure and pain are different only in degree, because this still does not make pleasure bad, nor or imply that some pleasure is not the best thing. Aristotle points out that if pleasure is not good then a happy (eudaimon) person will not have a more pleasant life than another, and would have no reason to avoid pain.

While any level of pain is bad, it is only excessive bodily pleasures that are bad. Aristotle considers why people are so attracted to bodily pleasures. Apart from depravities and cases where a bodily pleasure comes from returning to health, Aristotle asserts a more complex metaphysical reason, which is that for humans change is sweet, but only because of some disequilibrium, which is because part of every human is perishable, and "a nature that needs change... is not simple nor good". God, in contrast, "enjoys a single simple pleasure perpetually".

=== Books VIII and IX: Friendship ===
Book II Aristotle discussed friendship. Here Sachs discusses Aristotle's ideas about friendship (philia).

The treatment of friendship in the Nicomachean Ethics is longer than that of any other topic, and comes just before the conclusion of the whole inquiry. Books VIII and IX are continuous, but the break makes the first book focus on friendship as a small version of the political community, in which a bond stronger than justice holds people together, while the second treats it as an expansion of the self, through which all one's powers can approach their highest development. Friendship thus provides a bridge between the virtues of character and those of intellect.

Friendship, says Aristotle, is a virtue, or at any rate it implies virtue. And it is necessary for eudaimonia; indeed, if one had everything else but had no genuine friends, life would not be worth living. It is also an important consideration in justice and politics, as friendship is what holds states together.

Friendship exists when two people each wish for each other's good, and are both aware of this mutual relationship. The two sorts of friendship are friends who love each other because (and to the extent that) they are useful or pleasant to each other, and friends who love each other because they are good and virtuous and wish good things for the other for the other's sake. The first sort is inferior to the last because of the motive (friendships of utility and pleasure do not regard friends as people, but for what they can offer) and also because they are more fragile (likely to disintegrate if the utility or pleasure goes away).

Friendships of utility are relationships formed without regard to the other person. These friendships are grouped along with family ties and of hospitality to foreigners, types of friendships Aristotle associates with older people. Friendships of pleasure are based on fleeting emotions and are more associated with young people. While such friends like to be together, such friendships end whenever people no longer enjoy the shared activity, or can no longer participate in it together.

Friendships based upon what is good are the perfect form of friendship, in which both friends enjoy each other's virtue. As long as both friends maintain a virtuous character, the relationship will endure and be pleasant, useful, and good for both parties, since the motive behind it is care for the friend. Such relationships are rare, because good people are rare, and bad people do not take pleasure in each other.

Aristotle suggests that although the word friend is used in these different ways, it is best to say that friendships of pleasure and usefulness are only analogous to real friendships. It is sometimes possible that, at least in the case of people who are friends for pleasure, familiarity will lead to a better friendship as the friends learn to admire each other's characters. Perfect friendship may be incidentally utilitarian (it is in fact pleasant and useful) but is not primarily so. It requires trust, and it is difficult to trust someone who is not virtuous. The lesser, utilitarian species of friendship is also worthy of attention, but it is only a shadow of the real thing.

Genuine friendship seems to require regular in-person encounters. Friend must be amiable and enjoy spending time together (though these are not sufficient). It is possible to have many utilitarian friendships, but only a few true friends.

Friendships between people of differing status can present difficulties. People in authority sometimes have friends quick-witted of the pleasurable, and obedient friends of the useful sort, but the quick-witted ones may not be obedient, and obedient ones tend not to be quick-witted, rarely are the two united. Good, virtuous people tend not to make friends with people above their station (except with rare examples who are also exceptionally good and virtuous).

However, a sort of friendship between unequals is possible: such as friendship between a father and son. Rulers can have a friendly regard for their subjects. In such cases, friendship is a sort of respect that should be apportioned, like justice, according to the relative status of the parties: a son should respect the father more than the father respects the son; subjects should love their king more than the king loves any subject; etc. This is another way such friendship differs from genuine friendship, in which love and respect is equal, regardless of status, and in which loving rather than being-loved is valued. This makes it difficult for differently-situated people to become genuine friends, or for a genuine friendship to survive a rebalancing in status between the friends.

In friendships between unequals, the superior person thinks their status should qualify them for a superior share of its benefits; the inferior person thinks that they should be able to expect more benefits as they have less to give. Aristotle thinks one way to resolve this is to allow the inferior person receives a larger share of actual goods and assistance, while the superior person gains the larger share of honor from such beneficence, so they both benefit. This is true of the polis in general: some people contribute little and take much, other people contribute much and take little, but are repaid in honor. This is how mortals behave towards gods, and children towards parents. The relationship between benefactors and those they benefit also has a paradoxical friendship dynamic; the giver may enjoy the gift-giving more than the recipient enjoys the gift, and the giver may be more fond of the recipient than vice versa.

Friendship is a form of love, best exhibited in the giving rather than in the receiving.

Associations and friendships bind the polis together. Different relationships can be compared to the different types of constitution, according to the classification system Aristotle explains in his Politics (Monarchy, Tyranny, Aristocracy, Oligarchy, Timocracy, and Democracy). The difference between the good and bad types has to do with how virtuous, or self-serving, are those in power. A monarch cares for his kingdom and subjects; a tyrant, for himself. An aristocracy looks out for the good of the polis; an oligarchy tries to accrue more power and wealth for itself. A timocracy has the good of everyone in mind; a democracy tries to rob the minority to feed the majority. Similarly, a good friendship between a man and his wife in a patriarchy is like the friendship between an aristocracy and the commoners; a good friendship between brothers is like the friendship between timocrats.

The friendship between relatives is closer than that of fellow-citizens. And the closeness of such friendship is related to the closeness of kinship, as well as to their closeness-in-age, and the extent to which they have been brought up together. The friendship of parents and children is a special sort, akin to the relationship between the gods and mortals. The friendship between husband and wife is natural and fundamental—even more so than that of the tendency of people to come together in communities. Marriages may be utilitarian friendships or genuine ones.

Genuine friends do not have reason to complain about the justice of their friendship, because if they love more than they are loved, an imbalance is OK. In utilitarian friendships complaints over whether one of friend is contributing to the friendship, and each friend is eager to give less and get more. These sorts of conflicts are not best handled by a model of objective justice, but, in such cases, the value of favors received (and therefore how much return is due) ought generally to be determined by the recipient.

If obligations to friends conflict with each other, or with other obligations, no rules describe how to resolve them, but heuristics may help: repay debts, prefer kin to non-kin, prefer friends to others, respect elders, etc. A right answer, might be available, but no universal formula applies.

Utilitarian friendships are expected to last only as long as the utility. Genuine friendships can also end, for instance if one of the parties stops considering it a genuine friendship, or if one of friend descends into vice, or ascends beyond the other in virtue.

A virtuous person seeks friendships that resemble the relationship he has with himself. A virtuous person has integrity, and wishes what is actually good for himself, for his own sake. In this way he is like a genuine friend to himself, for a friend wishes for a friend what is good for the friend. Vicious people, on the other hand, are in conflict even with themselves (their appetites conflict with their reason, and so forth), and so they lack a foundation on which to build genuine friendships.

Enlightened self-regard is an important prerequisite for loving others. But the sort of self-love practiced by the intemperate is worse than useless. For this reason a good person ought to be encouraged in self-love, while a wicked person ought to be discouraged in it, since he does not know how to do so properly.

In times of bad fortune, it is good to have helpful friends; in times of good fortune, it is even better to be a helpful friend. Friends should not hesitate to aid each other, even unasked, but should avoid becoming the objects of a friends' kindness.

=== Book X: Pleasure, happiness, and upbringing ===
Aristotle discusses pleasure throughout the Ethics, but gives it a more focused and theoretical treatment in Book X. He starts by questioning the rule advanced in the more approximate early sections, by which people think pleasure should be avoided—if not because it is simply bad because people tend too much towards pleasure-seeking. He argues that people's actions show this to not be what they really believe, but is a "noble lie" taught for its supposed salutary effects.

He reviews arguments of previous philosophers, including Eudoxus (who considered pleasure to be the good) and Plato and Speusippos (who did not), to advance his own middle-way argument: pleasure is a good pursued for its own sake even if it is not The Good in a Platonic or ultimate sense.

Even if pleasure and pain are entirely orthogonal to virtue and vice, because these sensations are powerful motivators, particularly in the young. it is important for the ethicist to consider them.

To define what pleasure is, Aristotle applies his theory of motion (kinēsis) as an energeia (as explained in his Physics and Metaphysics). In this approach, pleasure is not a movement or kinēsis because unlike the movement of walking across a room, or building a house, it has no completion endpoint. It is more like seeing, which is either happening in a complete way or not happening. "Each moment of pleasurable consciousness is a perfect whole."

A sense perception like sight is in perfect activity (teleia energeia) when it is in its best conditions and directed at the best objects. Any sense in such perfect activity produces pleasure; similarly thinking (dianoia) and contemplation (theōria) have their associated pleasures. But seeing, for example, is a whole, as is the associated pleasure. Pleasure completes the seeing or thinking, in a way, but as an additional supervening activity that crowns it, rather than as something necessary to it.

Why does pleasure not last? Why does it fade as if from fatigue? Aristotle proposes that this is because pleasure accompanies activity and no activity can be continued indefinitely without fatigue, and because sensation requires some novelty and any pleasurable stimulus loses its appeal when repeated too often. Life is an activity (energeia) made up of many activities such as music, thinking, and contemplation, and pleasure brings supervening completion to each of these, leading to fulfillment and a life worth living. Aristotle says the question of whether life is for pleasure or pleasure is for the sake of living, for the two activities seem irreversibly intertwined.

Different activities—sense perceptions, thinking, contemplating—bring different kinds of pleasure, and these pleasures intensify the activities. Thus "for each activity has its own proper pleasure." For example a flute player gets better at playing while getting more pleasure from it. But these pleasures and their associated activities may impede each other, just as a flute player cannot participate in an argument while playing. This raises the question of which pleasures are to be pursued. Some pleasures are more beautiful and some are more base or corrupt. The pleasure a virtuous person feels from practicing virtue is a good pleasure; the pleasure a vicious person feels from practicing vice, less so (such "pleasures" hardly deserve the name).

Aristotle argues that each type of animal has pleasures appropriate to it, and in the same way people differ in the pleasures most suitable to them. Aristotle proposes that the person of serious moral stature is the appropriate standard.

==== Happiness ====
Finally, Aristotle returns to eudaimonia, the aim of the whole Ethics. According to the Book I definition it is an activity, good in and of itself, and chosen for its own sake (not instrumentally). Aristotle argued that virtues fit this definition, but perhaps recreational activity also fits the bill (a tennis game, for example, may be played for its own sake).

Aristotle thinks that this trivializes eudaimonia. Anybody can enjoy recreation, even a slave, and no one would want to be a slave. He believes recreation is not an end in itself, but a way of relaxing in preparation for (or to recover from) more noble activity: in other words it is instrumental.

Aristotle says that if perfect eudaimonia is activity in accordance with the highest virtue, then this highest virtue must be the virtue of the highest part of the soul. He says this must be the intellect (nous) "or whatever else it be that is thought to rule and lead us by nature, and to have cognizance of what is noble and divine". This highest activity, Aristotle says, must be philosophical contemplation (energeia... theōrētikē). This is also the most sustainable, pleasant, self-sufficient activity; and it is chosen for its own sake. To achieve it means to live in accordance with something immortal and divine which is within humans, and, "so far as we can, make ourselves immortal, and strain every nerve to live in accordance with the best thing in us". According to Aristotle, contemplation is the only type of happy activity in which the gods might be imagined to engage in. The intellect is the true self, and this type of happiness is the happiness most suited to humans, in that only humans possess both happiness (eudaimonia) and the intellect (nous). Aristotle also claims that compared to other virtues, contemplation requires the least in terms of possessions and allows the most self-reliance, "though it is true that, being a man and living in the society of others, he chooses to engage in virtuous action, and so will need external goods to carry on his life as a human being".

What distinguishes humans from other animals is that we reason. This is a hint to our purpose. And that in turn tells us how to fulfill our eudaimonia. "That which is proper to each thing is by nature best and most pleasant for each thing; for man, therefore, the life according to reason is best and pleasantest, since reason more than anything else is man. This life therefore is also the happiest." Indeed, eudaimonia itself is something peculiar to human beings, and this is fundamental:

Happiness extends... just so far as contemplation does, and those to whom contemplation more fully belongs are more truly happy, not as a mere concomitant but in virtue of the contemplation; for this is in itself precious. Happiness, therefore, must be some form of contemplation.

==== The need for education, habituation, and good laws ====
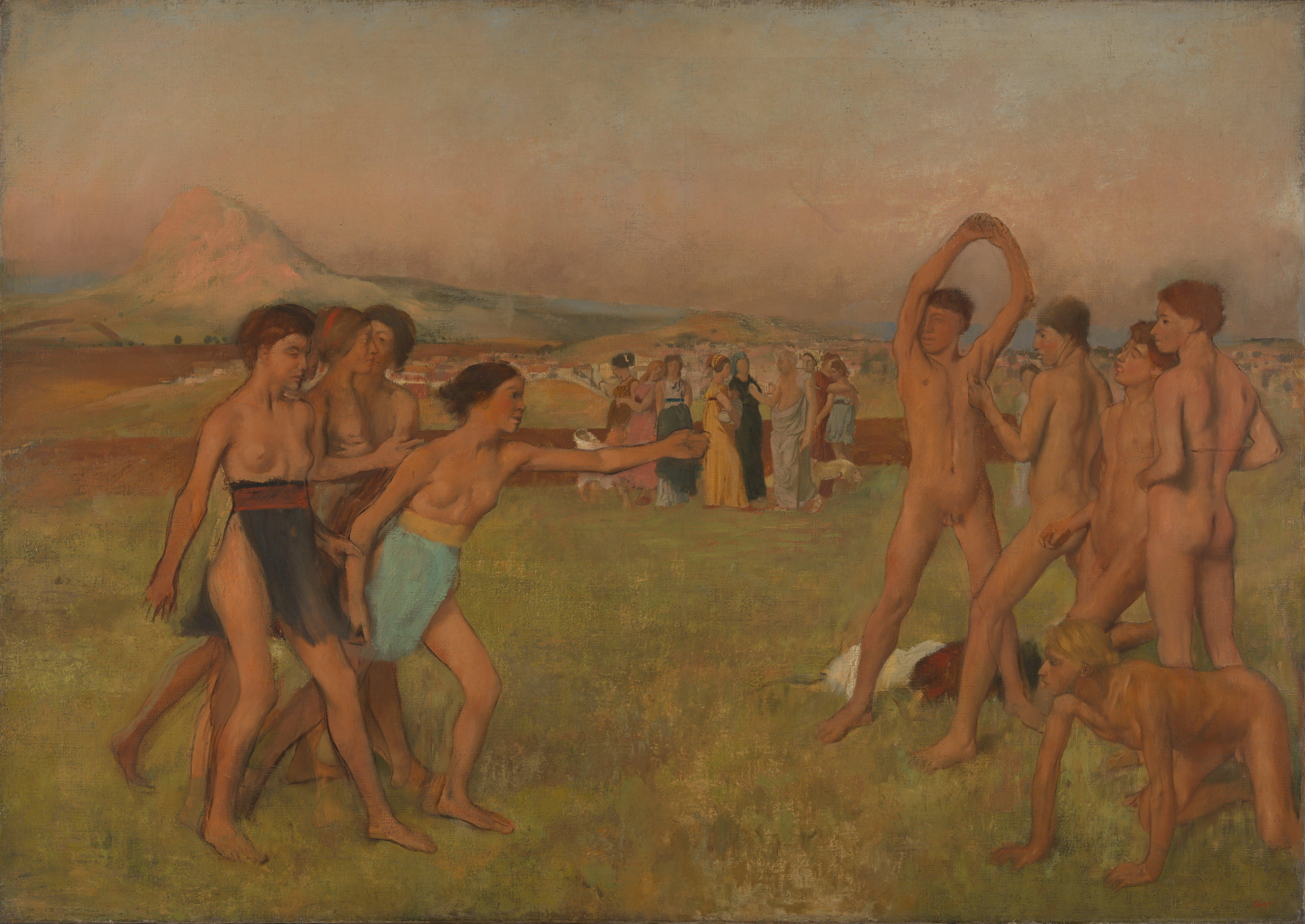
Young Spartans Exercising by Edgar Degas (1834–1917). Aristotle approved of how Spartan law focused upon up-bringing.

Aristotle reiterates that the Ethics has not reached its aim if it has no effect in practice. The point is not just to learn how to live, but to actually live that way. Theories are not enough.

The practice of virtue requires good education and habituation from an early age. Young people otherwise do not get to experience the highest forms of pleasure and are distracted by the easiest ones. While parents often attempt this sort of education, it is critical that the community enact good laws.

Concerning this need for good laws and education, Aristotle says he seeks to address an eternal problem: unlike in medical science, theoreticians of happiness and teachers of virtue such as sophists never have practical experience themselves, while good parents and lawmakers have never developed a scientific approach to analyzing what the best laws are. Furthermore, few lawmakers, perhaps only the Spartans, made education a focus of law-making, as they should. Education needs to be more like medicine, with both practice and theory, and this requires a new approach to studying politics. Such study should, he says, help even in communities where the laws are not good and the parents need to try to create the right habits in young people without help from lawmakers.

Aristotle closes the Nicomachean Ethics therefore by highlighting his sequel, Politics. (However, Politics as we have it today is significantly different from the promised discussion of politics Aristotle alludes to there.)

== Influence and derivative works ==
The Eudemian Ethics is sometimes considered to be a later commentary or paraphrase of the Nicomachean Ethics. The Magna Moralia is usually also interpreted as a post-Aristotle synthesis of Aristotelian Ethics including the Nicomachean and Eudemian, although it is sometimes also attributed to Aristotle.

Parts of a 2nd-century CE commentary about the Nicomachean Ethics by Aspasius exist. This is the earliest extant commentary on any of Aristotle's works, and is notable because Aspasius was a peripatetic, that is, of the Aristotelian scholastic tradition.

Aristotelian ethics was superseded by epicureanism and stoicism in Greek philosophy. In the West it did not regain interest until the 12th century, when the Nicomachean Ethics (and Averroes's 12th-century commentary on it) was rediscovered. Thomas Aquinas called Aristotle "The Philosopher", and published a separate commentary on the Nicomachean Ethics as well as incorporating (or responding to) many of its arguments in his Summa Theologica.

Domenico da Piacenza relied on Aristotle's description of the pleasures of motion in Book X as an authority in his 15th-century treatise on dance principles (one of the earliest written documents on the formal principles of dance that eventually become classical ballet). Da Piacenza, who taught that the ideal smoothness of dance movement could only be attained by a balance of qualities, relied on Aristotelian philosophical concepts of movement, measure, and memory to extol dance on moral grounds, as a virtue.

In G. E. M. Anscombe's 1958 essay "Modern Moral Philosophy", she noted that ethical philosophy had diverged so much since Aristotle that people who use modern ethical notions when discussing Aristotle's ethics "constantly feel like someone whose jaws have somehow got out of alignment: the teeth don't come together in a proper bite". Modern philosophy had, she believed, discarded Aristotle's human telos (and in its skepticism toward divine law as an adequate substitute), and lost a way of making the study of ethics meaningful. As a result, modern moral philosophy was floundering, unable to recall how its intuitions of good and bad could possibly be grounded in facts. She suggested that it might be possible to backtrack and recover an Aristotelian ethics, but that to do this would require updating some of Aristotle's metaphysical and psychological assumptions that are no longer plausible: "philosophically there is a huge gap, at present unfillable as far as we are concerned, which needs to be filled by an account of human nature, human action, the type of characteristic a virtue is, and above all of human 'flourishing.'"

The modern virtue ethics revival has taken up this challenge. Notably, Alasdair MacIntyre in After Virtue (1981) explicitly defended an Aristotelian ethics against modern ethical theories. He claimed that Nietzsche had shown the varieties of modern moral philosophy to be hollow and had effectively refuted them. But he says Nietzsche's refutations do not apply to "the quite distinctive kind of morality" found in Aristotelian ethics. So to recover ethics, "the Aristotelian tradition can be restated in a way that restores intelligibility and rationality to our moral and social attitudes and commitments".

== Editions ==
=== Greek text ===
- Aristotle (1836). Brewer, John S. (ed.). The Nicomachean Ethics of Aristotle, with English Notes. Oxford: Henry Slatter.
- Aristotle (1900). Burnet, John (ed.). The Ethics of Aristotle. London: Methuen & Co.
- Aristotle (1962) [1890]. Bywater, Ingram (ed.). Ethica Nicomachea. Oxford University Press.
- Aristotle (1885). Grant, Alexander (ed.). The Ethics of Aristotle, Illustrated with Essays and Notes (4th ed.). Longmans, Green & Co. (in two volumes: 1 and 2)
- Aristotle (1881). Hawkins, E.L. (ed.). The Nicomachean Ethics of Aristotle. Oxford: James Thornton. (Books I–IV and part of X)
- Aristotle (1884). Lancaster, Thomas William (ed.). The Nicomachean Ethics of Aristotle. Oxford: J. Vincent.
- Aristotle (1872). Aristotle's Nicomachean Ethics, Books V & X. Translated by Paley, F.A. Cambridge: J. Hall & Son. (Greek text and English translation in parallel)

=== Translations ===
- Aristotle (1984) [1975]. Nicomachean Ethics. Translated by Apostle, Hippocrates G. Grinnell, Iowa: Peripatetic Press. ISBN 0911589031. (With commentaries and glossary)
- Aristotle (2011). Nicomachean Ethics. Translated by Bartlett, Robert C.; Collins, Susan D. Chicago: University of Chicago Press. ISBN 978-0-226-02674-9. (Translation, with interpretive essay, notes, glossary)
- Aristotle (2020). Nicomachean Ethics. Translated by Beresford, Adam. Penguin Classics. ISBN 978-0-141-39524-1. (Translation, with introduction and notes.)
- Aristotle (2002). Nicomachean Ethics. Translated by Broadie, Sarah; Rowe, Christopher. Oxford: Oxford University Press.
- Aristotle (1850). The Nicomachean Ethics of Aristotle. Translated by Browne, R.W. London: Henry G. Bohn.
- Aristotle (1915) [1847]. The Nicomachean Ethics of Aristotle. Translated by Chase, Drummond P. London: Everyman's Library.
- Aristotle (2014) [2000]. Nicomachean Ethics. Translated by Crisp, Roger. Cambridge University Press. ISBN 978-1-107-03960-5.
- Aristotle (1797). Aristotle's Ethics and Politics, Comprising his Practical Philosophy. Vol. 1. Translated by Gillies, John. London: Cadell & Davies.
- Aristotle (1879). The Moral Philosophy of Aristotle. Translated by Hatch, Walter M. London: John Murray.
- Aristotle (1999). Nicomachean Ethics. Translated by Irwin, Terence. Hackett Publishing Company. ISBN 0-87220-464-2.
- Aristotle (1906). Nicomachean Ethics. Translated by Peters, F.H. Standard Ebooks.
- Aristotle (1934) [1926]. The Nicomachean Ethics with an English Translation. Loeb Classical Library 73. Translated by Rackham, H. New York: G.P. Putnam's Sons. ISBN 0674990811.
- Aristotle (2014). Nicomachean Ethics. Translated by Reeve, C. D. C. Indianapolis: Hackett Publishing Company, Inc. ISBN 978-1-62466-118-1. (Translation, with Introduction and Notes.)
- Aristotle (1925). The Nicomachean Ethics: Translated with an Introduction. Translated by Ross, David. Oxford: Oxford University Press.
- Aristotle (2002). Nicomachean Ethics: Translation, Glossary and Introductory Essay. Translated by Sachs, Joe. Focus Publishing. ISBN 1-58510-035-8.
- Aristotle (1955). The Ethics of Aristotle: The Nicomachean Ethics. Translated by Thomson, J. A. K. Penguin Classics. Re-issued 1976, revised by Hugh Tredennick.
- Aristotle (1835). A New Translation of the Nicomachean Ethics of Aristotle. Translated by Vincent, J. (3rd ed.). Oxford: J. & C. Vincent.
- Aristotle (1927) [1892]. The Nicomachean Ethics of Aristotle, Translated with an Analysis and Critical Notes. Translated by Welldon, J.E.C. London: MacMillan & Co.
- Aristotle (1879) [1869]. The Nicomachean Ethics of Aristotle. Translated by Williams, Robert (3rd ed.). Longmans, Green, & Co.

== See also ==
- Aristotelian ethics
- Corpus Aristotelicum
- Economics (Oeconomica)
- Potentiality and actuality
- Ethics
- Eudaimonia
- Eudemian Ethics (Ethica Eudemia)
- Hexis
- Intellectual virtue
- Lesbian rule
- Magna Moralia (Great Ethics)
- Moral character
- Nous
- On Virtues and Vices (De Virtutibus et Vitiis Libellus)
- Phronesis
- Politics
- Protrepticus
- Summum bonum
- Virtue
- Virtue ethics
- Golden mean (philosophy)
