= On Virtues and Vices =

Work formerly ascribed to Aristotle

On Virtues and Vices (Ancient Greek: Περὶ Ἀρετῶν καὶ Κακιῶν; Latin: De Virtutibus et Vitiis Libellus) is the shortest of the four ethical treatises attributed to Aristotle. The work is now regarded as spurious by scholars and its true origins are uncertain though it was probably created by a member of the peripatetic school.

== See also ==
- Eudemian Ethics
- Magna Moralia
- Nicomachean Ethics
