= Aristotle: Eudemian Ethics =

2013 book edited by Brad Inwood and Raphael Woolf

- Author: Brad Inwood, Raphael Woolf
- Subject: ethics
- Published: 2013
- Publisher: Cambridge University Press
- Pages: 204 pp.
- ISBN: 9781139043281

Aristotle: Eudemian Ethics is a 2013 book edited by Brad Inwood and Raphael Woolf in which the editors offer a translation of Aristotle's Eudemian Ethics and an introduction to Aristotle's ethical thought as a whole.
