= Rereading Ancient Philosophy =

2018 book edited by Verity Harte and Raphael Woolf

Rereading Ancient Philosophy: Old Chestnuts and Sacred Cows
- Cover
- Editors: Verity Harte; Raphael Woolf
- Language: English
- Subject: Ancient philosophy
- Publisher: Cambridge University Press
- Publication date: 2018
- Publication place: United Kingdom
- Media type: Print (Hardcover)
- Pages: 318 pp.
- ISBN: 9781107194977

Rereading Ancient Philosophy: Old Chestnuts and Sacred Cows is a 2018 book edited by Verity Harte and Raphael Woolf, in which the authors examine key texts and debates in ancient philosophy. The book is dedicated to the philosopher M. M. McCabe.

== Reception ==
Rereading Ancient Philosophy received a mixed review from Jay R. Elliott in Notre Dame Philosophical Reviews. The book was also reviewed by the classicist Christopher Rowe in the Journal of the History of Philosophy.

Elliott considered the essays included in the book a "fitting tribute" to McCabe. However, he found them of uneven value, writing that while they were generally rewarding, some suffered "from the pursuit of novelty" and wrongly suggested that "progress in ancient philosophy is currently being impeded by an abundance of widely-accepted but unexamined dogmas".
