= Raphael Woolf =

British philosopher

Education
- Education: King's College London (PhD); Cambridge University (BA)

Philosophical work
- Era: 21st-century philosophy
- Region: Western philosophy
- School: Ancient philosophy
- Institutions: King's College London
- Main interests: Plato, Aristotle, Hellenistic philosophy

Raphael Woolf is a British philosopher and Professor in the Department of Philosophy at King's College London. He is known for his expertise on ancient Greek and Roman philosophy.

== Books ==
- Cicero: The Philosophy of a Roman Sceptic, Routledge, 2015
- Rereading Ancient Philosophy: Old Chestnuts and Sacred Cows, edited by Verity Harte and Raphael Woolf, Cambridge University Press, 2018
- Aristotle: Eudemian Ethics, edited by Brad Inwood and Raphael Woolf, Cambridge University Press, 2013
