= Cicero: The Philosophy of a Roman Sceptic =

2015 book by Raphael Woolf

- First edition
- Author: Raphael Woolf
- Subject: Cicero's philosophy
- Published: 2015
- Publisher: Routledge
- Pages: 260 pp.
- ISBN: 9781844658411

Cicero: The Philosophy of a Roman Sceptic is a 2015 book by Raphael Woolf, in which the author provides an introduction to Cicero’s role in shaping ancient philosophy.
