= Hexis =

Relatively stable arrangement or disposition

Hexis (Ancient Greek: ἕξις) is a relatively stable arrangement or disposition, for example a person's health or knowledge or character. It is an Ancient Greek word, important in the philosophy of Aristotle, and because of this it has become a traditional word of philosophy. It stems from a verb related to possession or "having", and Jacob Klein, for example, translates it as "possession". In modern texts it is translated occasionally as "state" (e.g., H. Rackham), but more typically as "disposition".

== General description ==
Joe Sachs translates it as "active condition", in order to make sure that hexis is not confused with passive conditions of the soul, such as feelings and impulses or mere capacities that belong to us by nature. Sachs points to Aristotle's own distinction, explained for example in Categories 8b, which distinguishes the word diathesis, normally uncontroversially translated as disposition. In this passage, diathesis only applies to passive and shallow dispositions that are easy to remove and change, such as being hot or cold, while hexis is reserved for deeper and more active dispositions, such as properly getting to know something in a way that it will not be easily forgotten. Another common example of a human hexis in Aristotle is health (hugieia, or sometimes eu(h)exia, in Greek) and in cases where hexis is discussed in the context of health, it is sometimes translated as "constitution".

== Humans ==
Apart from needing to be relatively stable or permanent, in contexts concerning humans (such as knowledge, health, and good character) hexis is also generally understood to be contrasted from other dispositions, conditions and habits, by being "acquired" by some sort of training or other habituation.

According to Plotinus, virtue is a hexis of the soul that is not primarily related to praxis and habituation; hexis is a quality of being in an active state of possession that intellectualizes the soul in permanent contemplation of the intelligible world (Enn. VI.8.5.3–37).

Other uses also occur, for example it is sometimes translated as "habit", based upon the classical translation from Greek to Latin "habitus", which also comes from a verb indicating having.

The Latin term is also used in English and as a result "habitus" is for example also a term used in sociology.

== Aristotle ==
Being in a truly fixed state, as opposed to being stable, is not implied in the original Aristotelian usage of this word. He uses the example of "health" being a hexis.

"Having" (hexis) means (a) In one sense an activity (energeia), as it were, of the haver and the thing had, or as in the case of an action (praxis) or motion; for when one thing makes and another is made, there is between them an act of making. In this way between the man who has a garment and the garment which is had, there is a "having (hexis)." Clearly, then, it is impossible to have a "having" (hexis) in this sense; for there will be an infinite series if we can have the having of what we have. But (b) there is another sense of "having" which means a disposition (diathesis), in virtue of which (kath' ho) the thing which is disposed is disposed well or badly, and either independently or in relation to something else. E.g., health is a state (hexis), since it is a disposition of the kind described. Further, any part of such a disposition is called a state (hexis); and hence the excellence (arete) of the parts is a kind of state (hexis).

— Aristot. Met. 5.1022b

So according to Aristotle, a "hexis" is a type of "disposition" (diathesis) which he in turn describes in the same as follows...

"Disposition" means arrangement (taxis) of that which has parts, either in space (topos) or in potentiality (dunamis) or in form (eidos). It must be a kind of position (thesis), as indeed is clear from the word, "disposition" (diathesis).

— Aristot. Met. 5.1022b

And specifically it is the type of disposition "in virtue of which (kath' ho) the thing which is disposed is disposed well or badly, and either independently or in relation to something else".

The wording "in virtue of which" was also described in the same passage...

"That in virtue of which" has various meanings. (a) The form or essence of each individual thing; e.g., that in virtue of which a man is good is "goodness itself." (b) The immediate substrate in which a thing is naturally produced; as, e.g., color is produced in the surface of things. Thus "that in virtue of which" in the primary sense is the form, and in the secondary sense, as it were, the matter of each thing, and the immediate substrate. And in general "that in virtue of which" will exist in the same number of senses as "cause." For we say indifferently "in virtue of what has he come?" or "for what reason has he come?" and "in virtue of what has he inferred or inferred falsely?" or "what is the cause of his inference or false inference?" (And further, there is the positional sense of kath' ho, "in which he stands," or "in which he walks"; all these examples denote place or position).

— Aristot. Met. 5.1022a

In Aristotle then, a hexis is an arrangement of parts such that the arrangement might have excellence, being well arranged, or in contrast, might be badly arranged. Also see Aristotle's Categories viii where a hexis ("habit" in the translation of Edghill) is contrasted with a disposition (diathesis) in terms of it being more permanent and less easy to change. The example given is "knowledge" (epistemē).

In perhaps the most important case, Aristotle contrasted hexis with energeia (in the sense of activity or operation) at Nicomachean Ethics I.viii.1098b33 and Eudemian Ethics II.i.1218b. The subject here was eudaimonia, the proper aim of human life, often translated as "happiness" and hexis is contrasted with energeia (ἐνέργεια) in order to show the correctness of a proposed definition of eudaimonia - "activity (ἐνέργεια) in conformity with virtue"

Now with those who pronounce happiness to be virtue, or some particular virtue, our definition is in agreement; for ‘activity (ἐνέργεια) in conformity with virtue’ (aretē) involves virtue. But no doubt it makes a great difference whether we conceive the Supreme Good to depend on possessing virtue or on displaying it—on disposition (ἕξις), or on the manifestation of a disposition in action. For a man may possess the disposition without its producing any good result, as for instance when he is asleep, or has ceased to function from some other cause; but virtue in active exercise cannot be inoperative—it will of necessity act (praxis), and act well (eu praxei). And just as at the Olympic games the wreaths of victory are not bestowed upon the handsomest and strongest persons present, but on men who enter for the competitions—since it is among these that the winners are found,—so it is those who act rightly who carry off the prizes and good things of life.

— Aristot. Nic. Eth. 1098b

== Happiness ==
Happiness then, is an energeia, but virtue of character (often translated as "moral virtue") is made up of hexeis. Happiness is said to deserve honoring like the divine if it be actually achieved, while virtue of character, being only a potential achievement, deserves praise but is lower.

== New Testament ==
14 But strong meat belongeth to them that are of full age, even those who by reason of use(1838) have their senses exercised to discern both good and evil.

— Hebrews 5:14 (KJV)

...and defined in the Strong's concordance...

1838 ἕξις [hexis /hex·is/] n f. From 2192; GK 2011; AV translates as “use” once. 1 a habit whether of body or mind. 2 a power acquired by custom, practice, use.

== Bibliography ==
- Klein, Jacob (1965), A Commentary on Plato's Meno, University of North Carolina Press
- Sachs, Joe (1995), Aristotle's Physics: A guided study
- Sachs, Joe (1999), "Introduction by Joe Sachs", Aristotle's Metaphysics, a new translation by Joe Sachs, Santa Fe, NM: Green Lion Books, ISBN 1-888009-03-9
- Stamatellos, Giannis (2015), "Virtue and Hexis in Plotinus", International Journal of the Platonic Tradition 9.2:129–145
