= Verity Harte =

British philosopher

- Awards: Whitney Humanities Center Fellowship; Yale Graduate Mentor Award

Education
- Education: University of Cambridge

Philosophical work
- Era: 21st-century philosophy
- Region: Western philosophy
- School: Ancient philosophy
- Institutions: Yale University
- Website: classics.yale.edu/people/verity-harte

Verity Harte is a British philosopher and George A. Saden Professor of Philosophy and Classics at Yale University.

== Biography ==
Harte read for a BA in classics at Cambridge, before taking an MPhil and PhD in philosophy. She then held a research fellowship at St Edmund’s College, Cambridge, before moving to St Hilda’s College, Oxford as a research fellow.

She then became a lecturer in philosophy at King's College London, rising to the rank of reader before moving to Yale University in 2006.

== Books ==
- Plato on Parts and Wholes: the Metaphysics of Structure, Oxford: Clarendon 2002
- Aristotle and the Stoics Reading Plato, co-edited by Harte, M.M. McCabe, R.W. Sharples, A. Sheppard, London: Institute of Classical Studies 2011
- Politeia in Greek and Roman Philosophy, co-edited by Harte and Melissa Lane, Cambridge: CUP 2013
- Rereading Ancient Philosophy: Old Chestnuts and Sacred Cows, co-edited by Harte and Raphael Woolf, Cambridge University Press 2018
