= Magna Moralia =

Work on ethics traditionally attributed to Aristotle

The Magna Moralia (Latin for "Great Ethics") is a treatise on ethics traditionally attributed to Aristotle, though the consensus now is that it represents an epitome of his ethical thought by a later, if sympathetic, writer. Several scholars have disagreed with this, taking the Magna Moralia to be an authentic work by Aristotle, notably Friedrich Schleiermacher, Hans von Arnim, and J. L. Ackrill. In any case, it is considered a less mature piece than Aristotle's other ethical works, viz. the Nicomachean Ethics and the Eudemian Ethics. There is some debate as to whether they follow more closely the Eudemian or the Nicomachean version of the Ethics.

== History of the title ==
The name "Magna Moralia" cannot be traced further back in time than the reign of Marcus Aurelius. Henry Jackson suggested that the work acquired its name from the fact that the two rolls into which it is divided would have loomed large on the shelf in comparison to the eight rolls of the Eudemian Ethics, even though the latter are twice as long. The title has been translated to Greek as "Ἠθικὰ Μεγάλα."

== Editions ==
- Losada (Spanish) paperback edition, ISBN 950-03-9305-0
- Translation by Thomas Taylor (1812), OCLC 16627936
- Harvard University Press hardcover edition (with the Metaphysics), ISBN 0-674-99317-9
- "Magna Moralia" translated by St. George Stock (Internet Archive, 1915)
- Free Audiobook Version of "Magna Moralia" translated by St. George Stock (Librivox)

== See also ==
- Minima Moralia
