= Economics (Aristotle) =

Work ascribed to Aristotle

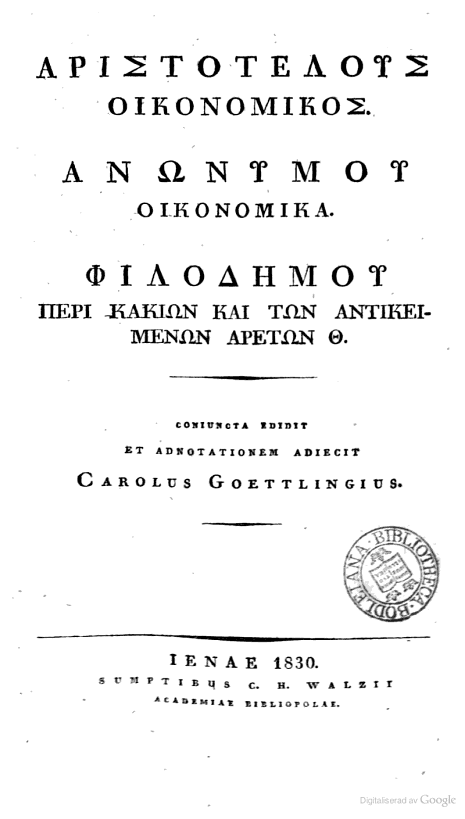
Book cover of an edition of Oikonomikos from 1830.

The Economics (Ancient Greek: Οἰκονομικά; Latin: Oeconomica) is a work ascribed to Aristotle. Most modern scholars attribute it to a student of Aristotle or of his successor Theophrastus.

== Introduction ==
The title of this work means "household management" and is derived from the Greek word, οἶκος, oikos, meaning "house/household". The term includes household finance as it is commonly known today and also defines the roles members of the household should have. In a broad sense the household is the beginning to economics as a whole. The natural, everyday activities of maintaining a house are essential to the beginnings of economy. From farming, cleaning, and cooking to hiring workers and guarding your property, the household can offer a model for a modern understanding of society. The two books that comprise this treatise explore the meaning of economics while showing that it has many different aspects.

== Book I ==
Book I is broken down into six chapters that begin to define economics. The text starts by describing that economics and politics differ in two major ways, one, in the subjects with which they deal and two, the number of rulers involved. Like an owner of a house, there is only one ruling in an economy, while politics involves many rulers. The practitioners of both sciences are trying to make the best use of what they have in order to thrive.

A household is made up of a man and his property. Next, agriculture is the most natural form of good use for this property. The man should then find a wife. Children should come next because they will be able to take care of the household as the man grows old. These are called the subject matter of economics.

The duties of a wife are the next important topic. A wife should be treated respectfully by her husband, and she will help him by bearing children. A man has to be modest in sexual encounters with his wife and not dwell on sexual experiences. The wife should be nurturing and attend to the quiet aspects of the household. Her duties should center on maintaining the inner part of the house. The male should have instilled in him the belief he should never wrong his wife.

Next, the male involved in agriculture will need slaves to help him perform his duties. A slave should be given food for his work but be well disciplined. It is the duty of a man to oversee every aspect of his land, since it belongs to him. The quality of his land should never be left to others alone, because people do not naturally respect a man’s property as he does himself. As a true economist, a man needs to bring four qualities to the possession of wealth. Acquisition of land and guarding it are key. Wise usage results in produce that can be sold, thus increasing wealth.

Book I, then, is an introduction showing the basic formation of an economy. As every man performs these duties, a system will involve the buying and selling of properties and a flourishing lifestyle that supports a civilization. With these basic guidelines man can accumulate wealth and stimulate a form of economy.

== Book II ==
The second book begins with the idea that there are four different types of economies. These are the Royal Economy, the Satrapic Economy, the Political Economy, and the Personal Economy. Whoever intends to participate successfully and supportively in an economy needs to know every characteristic of the part of economy he is involved in.

Economy	Specialties	Additional Info
Royal economy – The simplest and most important: Consists of the king	Coinage, imports, exports, expenditures	Up to the top management of the king to decide value of coins struck, advantages of the markets and other commodities
Satrapic economy—The medium between the economies: Involves the provincial governor	Six kinds of revenues: from land, from peculiar products, from merchandise, from taxes, from cattle, from all other resources	Government officials work with the Royal officials; Most important source of revenue: land, then scarce resources, then merchandise
Political economy—Most varied and easiest: “The economy of the city”	Truly the economy of the city; Economy at a smaller level	Sources of revenue involve merchandise, scarce resources, and taxes
Personal economy— Least important, quite varied: Practiced by the individual	Least important because income and exchange of money are small	Revenue consists of land, property, and investments; Very diverse opportunities that establish the flow of money, no specific aim

All the economies have one principle in common. No matter what is done, expenditures cannot exceed income. This is given as an important issue, fundamental to the notion of ‘economy.’ The rest of the second book relates historical events that created important ways in which economies began to function more efficiently and gives the origins of certain terms still in use today. The main topic is the flow of money through any economy and particular events.

Aristotle also established a difference between economics and chrematistics that would be foundational in medieval thought. For Aristotle, the accumulation of money itself is an unnatural activity that dehumanizes those who practice it.

War, and more specifically overall protection of countries, gave rise to many forms of loans, debt, increased taxes, and complex investments. War demanded an increase of money to cover expenses. So, places like Athens needed either to borrow money from other places or be given men (mercenaries) through specific financial arrangements.

Other events like paying for sea exploration and schooling also increased different types of money exchange, further stimulating economies. In sum, the treatise provides a view of Fourth-century Greek economic practices from the macro levels all the way down to various micro levels. Observing these can still be relevant today.

The third book is only known from Latin versions of the original Greek and deals with the relationship between husband and wife.

== See also ==
- Politics (Aristotle)
- Oeconomicus by Xenophon
