= Kalos kagathos =

Ancient Greek ideal of gentlemanly virtue

Kalos kagathos or kalokagathos (Ancient Greek: καλὸς κἀγαθός [kalòs kaːɡatʰós]), of which kalokagathia (καλοκαγαθία) is the derived noun, is a phrase used by classical Greek writers to describe an ideal of gentlemanly personal conduct, especially in a military context.

Its use is attested since Herodotus and the classical period. The phrase is adjectival, composed of two adjectives, καλός ("beautiful") and ἀγαθός ("good" or "virtuous"), the second of which is combined by crasis with καί ("and") to form κἀγαθός.

Werner Jaeger summarizes it as "the chivalrous ideal of the complete human personality, harmonious in mind and body, foursquare in battle and speech, song and action".

== Uses ==
The word was a term used in Greek when discussing the concept of aristocracy. It became a fixed phrase by which the Athenian aristocracy referred to itself; in the ethical philosophers, the first of whom were Athenian gentlemen, the term came to mean the ideal or perfect man.

The phrase could be used both in a generic sense, or with certain specific force. As a generic term, it may have been used as the combination of distinct virtues, which we might translate as "handsome and brave", or the intersection of the two words "good" or "upstanding". Translations such as "gentleman" or "knight" have traditionally been suggested to convey the social aspect of the phrase, while "war hero" or the more cynical "martyr" are more recent versions, and emphasise the military element.

Its recorded usage dates from the second half of the 5th and in the 4th century B.C.. For example, in Plato's Lysis, a young man is described as imbued with kalokagathia.

There is thematic discussion of kalokagathia in Aristotle's Eudemian Ethics, Book VIII, chapter 3 (1248b). And how a kalos kagathos (gentleman) should live is also discussed at length in Xenophon's Socratic dialogues, especially the Oeconomicus.

In Aristotle, the term becomes important as a technical term used in discussions about Ethics.

== Kalos ==
The adjective καλός means beautiful and encompasses meanings equivalent to English "good", "noble", and "handsome". The form given by convention is the masculine, but it was equally used of women (the feminine form is καλή) and could also describe animals or inanimate objects.

Plato, in his work Republic, used the term τὸ καλόν (the neutral form) in his attempts to define ideals. However, his protagonist in the dialogue, Socrates, states that he did not fully comprehend the nature of this καλόν.

== Agathos ==
This second adjective means "good" in a broad and general sense, and had no particular physical or aesthetic connotations, but could describe a person's excellence of character (ethical virtue), for example their bravery. In the 4th century, it often carried implications of dutiful citizenship.

== Related terms ==
Plato coined the term Agathos kai sophos (Ancient Greek: ἀγαθὸς καὶ σοφός) which literally means "good and wise" in Greek, to avoid association with the belief that external beauty (kalos) was associated with inner beauty, morality and virtue.

In Aristotle's ethical works such as the Nicomachean Ethics and Eudemian Ethics, the term megalopsuchia ("greatness of soul", magnanimity) has been interpreted as being "large scale kalokagathia" by the scholar Jennifer Whiting (1998). Her interpretation is dependent upon the interpretation that for Aristotle, both kalokagathia and megalopsuchia, are not, in their true forms, virtues that come about only because people want to be honoured for doing good things.

The possession of the beautiful and the good has a correspondent in Latin: mens sana in corpore sano ("a healthy soul in a healthy body"). It is also seen as a target in balanced education of body and spirit.

== See also ==
- Arete
- Philotimo
- De Tranquillitate Animi
- Junzi
- Male beauty
- Mensch
