= Eudemian Ethics =

Work of philosophy by Aristotle

The Eudemian Ethics (Greek: Ἠθικὰ Εὐδήμεια; Latin: Ethica Eudemia or De moribus ad Eudemum) is a work of philosophy by Aristotle. Its primary focus is on ethics, making it one of the primary sources available for study of Aristotelian ethics. It is named for Eudemus of Rhodes, a pupil of Aristotle who may also have had a hand in editing the final work. It is commonly believed to have been written before the Nicomachean Ethics, although this is controversial.

== Overview ==
The Eudemian Ethics is less well known than Aristotle's Nicomachean Ethics, and, when scholars refer simply to the Ethics of Aristotle, the latter is generally intended. The Eudemian Ethics is shorter than the Nicomachean Ethics, eight books as opposed to ten, and some of its most interesting passages are mirrored in the latter. Books IV, V, and VI of the Eudemian Ethics, for example, are identical to Books V, VI, and VII of the Nicomachean Ethics, and as a result some critical editions of the former include only Books I–III and VII–VIII (the omitted books being included in the publisher's critical edition of the latter).

The translator for the Loeb edition, Harris Rackham, states in the Introduction to that edition that "in some places The Eudemian Ethics is fuller in expression or more discursive than The Nicomachean Ethics." Compared to the Nicomachean Ethics, Rackham mentions, for example in Book III, which discusses the virtues and some minor graces of character:

- It "inserts the virtue of Mildness between Temperance and Liberality". Temperance is discussed at the end of Book III of the Nicomachean Ethics, and Liberality immediately afterwards in the beginning of Book IV.
- It "adds to the minor Graces of Character Nemesis (righteous indignation at another's undeserved good or bad fortune), Friendliness and Dignity, while it omits Gentleness and Agreeableness". The Nicomachean Ethics actually states in Book II that Nemesis will be discussed within that work, but never does so.

Book VII is concerning friendship, discussed in greater length and detail in the Nicomachean Ethics than it is here. Book VIII discusses the epistemological aspect of virtue, which as Rackham notes is treated in Book I section 9 of Nicomachean Ethics, and also discusses good luck. Then there is a section concerning kalokagathia, the beautiful and good nobility of a gentleman, a virtue which implies all the moral virtues as well as good fortune. This has no parallel in the Nicomachean Ethics. And then finally there is some discussion of speculative wisdom or "theoria".

Although Nicomachean Ethics is better known than Eudemian Ethics today, German philologist Dieter Harlfinger suggested that in fact Eudemian Ethics were the common book transmitted in early days. This opinion is also supported by British philosopher Anthony Kenny, that the complete eight-book of Eudemian Ethics was the standard text on Aristotelian ethics for over four hundred years until the time of Aspasius, Aristotle commentator in the first half of second century AD.

== English translations ==
- The Eudemian Ethics by Anthony Kenny, Oxford, 2011.
- Aristotle: Eudemian Ethics, edited by Brad Inwood and Raphael Woolf, Cambridge University Press, 2013.
