= Mos maiorum =

Customs and traditions of ancient Rome

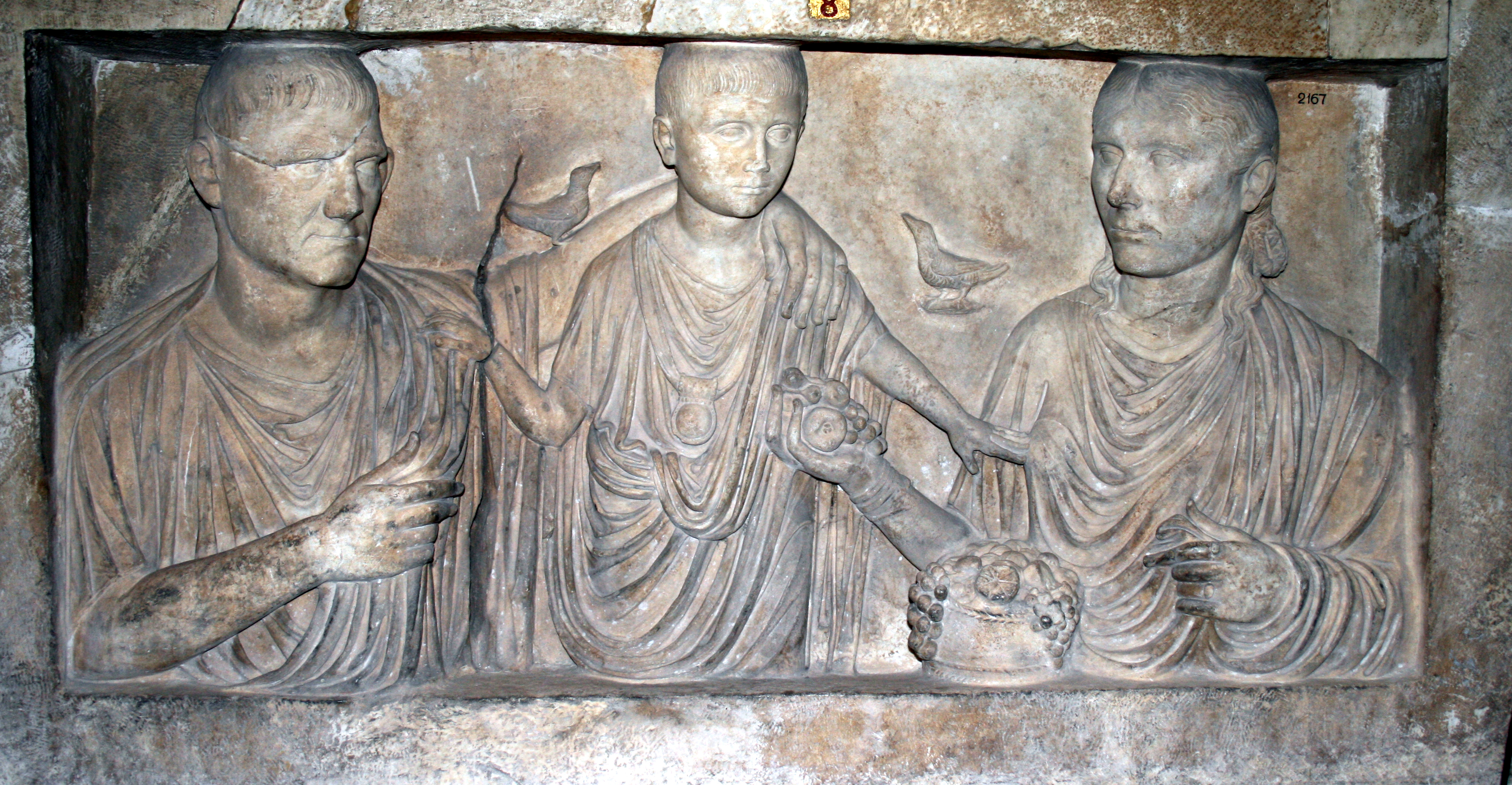
The Roman family was one of the ways that the mos maiorum was passed along through the generations.

The mos maiorum (Classical Latin: [ˈmoːs majˈjoːrʊ̃]; "ancestral custom" or "way of the ancestors"; pl.: mores, cf. English "mores"; maiorum is the genitive plural of "greater" or "elder") is the unwritten code from which the ancient Romans derived their social norms. It is the core concept of Roman traditionalism, distinguished from but in dynamic complement to written law. The mos maiorum was collectively the time-honoured principles, behavioural models, and social practices that affected private, political, and military life in ancient Rome.

== Family and society ==
The Roman family (the familia, better translated as "household" than "family") was hierarchical, as was Roman society. These hierarchies were traditional and self-perpetuating, that is, they supported and were supported by the mos maiorum. The pater familias, or head of household, held absolute authority over his familia, which was both an autonomous unit within society and a model for the social order, but he was expected to exercise this power with moderation and to act responsibly on behalf of his family. The risk and pressure of social censure if he failed to live up to expectations was also a form of mos.

The distinctive social relationship of ancient Rome was that between patron (patronus) and client (cliens). Although the obligations of this relationship were mutual, they were also hierarchical. The relationship was not a unit, but a network (clientela), as a patronus might himself be obligated to someone of higher status or greater power, and a cliens might have more than one patron, whose interests might come into conflict. If the familia was the discrete unit underlying society, these interlocking networks countered that autonomy and created the bonds that made a complex society possible. Although one of the major spheres of activity within patron-client relations was the law courts, patronage was not itself a legal contract; the pressures to uphold one's obligations were moral, founded on the quality of fides, "trust" (see Values below), and the mos. Patronage served as a model when conquerors or governors abroad established personal ties as patron to whole communities, ties which then might be perpetuated as a family obligation. In this sense, mos becomes less a matter of unchanging tradition than precedent.

== Tradition and evolution ==
Roman conservatism finds succinct expression in an edict of the censors from 92 BC, as preserved by the 2nd-century historian Suetonius: "All new that is done contrary to the usage and customs of our ancestors, seems not to be right." However, because the mos maiorum was a matter of custom, not written law, the complex norms that it embodied evolved over time. The ability to preserve a strongly-centralised sense of identity while it adapted to changing circumstances permitted the expansionism that took Rome from city-state to world power. The preservation of the mos maiorum depended on consensus and moderation among the ruling elite whose competition for power and status threatened it.

Democratic politics, driven by the charismatic appeal of individuals (populares) to the Roman people (populus), potentially undermined the conservative principle of the mos. Because the higher magistracies and priesthoods were originally the prerogative of the patricians, the efforts of plebeians (the plebs) for access could be cast as a threat to tradition (see Conflict of the Orders). Reform was accomplished by legislation, and written law replaced consensus. When plebeians gained admission to nearly all the highest offices, except for a few arcane priesthoods, the interests of plebeian families who ascended to the elite began to align with those of the patricians, creating Rome's nobiles, an elite social status of nebulous definition during the Roman Republic. The plebs and their support of popular politicians continued as a threat to the mos and elite consensus into the late Republic, as noted in the rhetoric of Cicero.

During the transition to the Christian Empire, Quintus Aurelius Symmachus argued that Rome's continued prosperity and stability depended on preserving the mos maiorum, and the early Christian poet Prudentius dismissed the conservative adherence to native Roman traditions as "the superstition of old grandpas" (superstitio veterum avorum) and inferior to the new revealed truth of Christianity.

After the final collapse of the Western Roman Empire in 476 AD and ascension of the various Barbarian kingdoms, the old Roman mores were then either superseded by or synthesized with the traditions of the Germanic elite and subsequent feudal values.

== Values ==
Traditional Roman values were essential to the mos maiorum:

=== Fides ===
- The Latin word fides encompasses several English words, such as trust/trustworthiness, good faith/faithfulness, confidence, reliability and credibility. It was an important concept in Roman law, as oral contracts were common. The concept of fides was personified by the goddess Fides whose role in the mos maiorum is indicated by the history of her cult. Her temple is dated from around 254 BC and was located on the Capitoline Hill in Rome, near the Temple of Jupiter.

=== Pietas ===
- Pietas was the Roman attitude of dutiful respect towards the gods, homeland, parents and family, which required the maintenance of relationships in a moral and dutiful manner. Cicero defined pietas as "justice towards the gods.” It went beyond sacrifice and correct ritual performance to inner devotion and righteousness of the individual, and it was the cardinal virtue of the Roman hero Aeneas in Vergil's Aeneid. The use of the adjectival form Pius as a cognomen reflects its importance as an identifying trait. Like Fides, Pietas was cultivated as a goddess, with a temple vowed to her in 191 BC and dedicated ten years later.

=== Religio and cultus ===
- Related to the Latin verb religare, "to bind", religio was the bond between gods and mortals, as carried out in traditional religious practices for preserving the pax deorum (“peace of the gods”). Cultus was the active observance and the correct performance of rituals. Religious practice, in this sense, is to be distinguished from pietas and its inherent morality. See religion in ancient Rome and imperial cult (ancient Rome).

=== Disciplina ===
- The military character of Roman society suggests the importance of disciplina, as related to education, training, discipline and self-control.

=== Gravitas and constantia ===
- Gravitas was dignified self-control. Constantia was steadiness or perseverance. In the face of adversity, a good Roman was to display an unperturbed façade. Roman myth and history reinforced this value by recounting tales of figures such as Gaius Mucius Scaevola, who in a founding legend of the Republic demonstrated his seriousness and determination to the Etruscan king Lars Porsenna by holding his right hand in a fire.

=== Virtus ===
- Derived from the Latin word vir ("man"), virtus constituted the ideal of the true Roman male. Gaius Lucilius discusses virtus in some of his work and says that it is virtus for a man to know what is good, evil, useless, shameful or dishonorable. The Roman concept of liberty (libertas), for the male citizens, was predicated in part on the right to preserve his body from physical compulsion, and this translated to a refusal to be dominated and a type of "conquest mentality" within Roman manhood (virtus). In extension, it was accepted for freeborn Roman males to engage in male-male intercourse only if he took the active penetrative role (otherwise his virtus would be in question or violated). Romans relatedly described both sexual and imperial domination in terms of transgressing the recipient's virtus. One of Rome's most important ethical rubrics, sexual morality, was therefore heavily associated with virtus and its varied implications for freeborn Roman males.

=== Dignitas and auctoritas ===
- Dignitas and auctoritas were the result of displaying the values of the ideal Roman and the service of the state, in the forms of priesthoods, military positions and magistracies. Dignitas was reputation for worth, honour and esteem. Thus, a Roman who displayed their gravitas, constantia, fides, pietas and other values of a Roman would possess dignitas among their peers. Similarly, by that path, a Roman could earn auctoritas ("prestige and respect").

== See also ==
- Religion in ancient Rome – religious practices in ancient Rome
- The Ancient City – perennial 1864 book by Numa Denis Fustel de Coulanges
- O tempora, o mores! – exclamation by Cicero, most famously in first Catilinarian oration ("Oh what times! Oh what customs!")
- Roman Polytheistic Reconstructionism – contemporary movement reviving traditional Roman religion
