= Magnificence (history of ideas) =

Word which means to do something great

The word magnificence comes from the Latin “magnum facere”, which means to do something great. The Latin word draws on the Greek “megaloprépeia”. This noun conveys the meaning of doing something great which is fitting or seemly to the circumstance. Magnificence is a philosophical, aesthetic, and socio-economic notion deeply rooted in Western culture since classical antiquity.

== Magnificence in Classical Antiquity ==
=== Plato ===
Plato offered the first philosophical interpretation of the concept of magnificence. He separated megalopsychía (magnanimity) from megaloprépeia (magnificence), which had been synonymous in archaic Greek. Magnificence (μεγαλοπρεπεια) is one of the virtues listed by Meno in Plato's dialogue of that name.

Magnificence is the special quality in Plato's conception of the philosopher-king, as presented in the fifth and sixth books of The Republic. Only those with a philosophical and educational temperament understand the difference between good and evil. The philosopher is magnificent, gracious, the friend of truth, justice, courage, and temperance, has an excellent memory and learns easily. When perfected by age and education this magnificent being is the type of person to whom the state must be entrusted.

=== Herodotus and Xenophon ===
The historians Herodotus and Xenophon proposed a social and economic interpretation of magnificence. They used the term to describe the donation of private money and property to support public works or communal needs. In ancient Greek and Middle-Eastern societies this was a widespread custom. Affluent citizens holding public positions were expected to use their own money for a wide range of activities that were deemed important by their communities.

In the Histories, Herodotus gives various examples of magnificence, such as that of Polycrates; the Scythians' magnificent festivity of the goddess Cybele; Amyntas's invitation to the Persians to feast and be entertained by him with great generosity and displays of friendship; Clisthenes's sumptuous treatment of his daughter's suitors when seeking a good marriage for her.

Xenophon, in his treatise Oeconomicus introduces magnificence within the meaning of wealth and social obligations. In keeping with the phenomenon of evergetism (as outlined by Paul Veyne), affluent citizens are called upon to offer many costly sacrifices such as building all sorts of public works (such as fortifications, war boats, temples, or amphitheaters); supplying an army with all the equipment and provisions it needed; offering entertainment and shows; and hosting prominent foreign guests and regaling them with lavish hospitality. Even fellow citizens must be plied by them with all sorts of nice things. Magnificence is thus connected with liberality, high lifestyles, and wealth. Critobulus, says Socrates in the dialogue, is called upon to be magnificent in order to live up to his reputation as an affluent citizen. Magnificent deeds give public honor to wealthy citizens and the entire city. Xenophon extends magnificence to women. For example, Mania, the widow of Zenis, the governor of Aeolis, not only convinced the Persian satrap Pharnabazus to appoint her as the new governess, but excelled in her military, political, and economic duties, never lacking in magnificence whenever it was required.

=== Aristotle ===
In his Eudemian Ethics and Nicomachean Ethics, Aristotle offers a philosophical, ethical, and aesthetic interpretation of magnificence that exerted an extensive influence throughout the following centuries.

In the fourth book of the Nicomachean Ethics, Aristotle describes magnificence as the ethical virtue linked to money: "It is a fitting expenditure involving largeness of scale" However, Aristotle insists that the type of expenditure must be appropriate to the circumstance. Hence, not every type of action requires the same degree of expense. Thus, Aristotle, like Plato, consolidates the separation of the virtues of magnificence and magnanimity. Drawing on Xenophon, however, he dignifies the economic aspect of a great expenditure by turning it into an ethical virtue.

With Aristotle, magnificence also acquires an aesthetic dimension. It becomes an art in itself, requiring that one understands what type of expenditure is needed and that one spends tastefully. A magnificent man knows that the expenditure should be large, but appropriate to who is actually spending, the circumstance, and the object of the expense. The Aristotle scholar W. D. Ross suggested that in this conception magnificence turns out to be mainly a matter of aesthetic good taste. The aesthetic role that magnificence acquired with Aristotle exerted a profound influence on rhetoric, the arts, architecture, and art criticism.

=== Cicero and Rome ===
Cicero introduced the ethic of magnificence to ancient Roman and Italian civilization. In his youthful work on rhetoric, De inventione, he wrote that magnificence is "the consideration and management of important and sublime matters with a certain wide seeing and splendid determination of mind". Thus Cicero fused the Greek and Roman traditions, transforming the Greek view of magnificence into a Roman concept. The Latin word magnificentia comes from the expression magnum facere, which literally means "to do something great". In Cicero's formulation, it refers to the greatness of the task, the intention to realize it, and the determination to carry it through. Cicero's seminal interpretation of magnificence influenced Thomas Aquinas in his Summa Theologiæ over a thousand years later.

=== Magnificence in Ancient Rome ===
Magnificence took on Roman characteristics. In ancient Rome, it is a public phenomenon connected to the institutions, political power and the Roman state. The magnificence of the buildings, roads, public buildings, and festivals were under the control of the aediles. Furthermore, magnificence has nothing to do with luxury. Instead, it reflects a system of republican values and virtues embraced by the traditionalist Roman oligarchy. When Cicero claims that "the Roman people loathe private luxury (luxuriam) but they love public magnificence (magnificentiam)", he is making an explicit reference to a political system that was being undermined by a new generation of politicians. Whereas luxury represented the use of wealth to serve personal satisfaction, magnificence rested on traditional republican values based on respect for an appropriate relationship between private and public life.

=== Rhetoric, Demetrius, and art criticism ===
In classical rhetoric, magnificence is one of the models of the grand or elevated style. The most important work on magnificence in the classical world is On Style (Perì hermēnēías) written by Demetrius of Phalerum probably in the first century BCE. Demetrius gives a technical description of the typical features of the elevated style. The historian Thucydides and the poet Sappho are presented as the leading exponents of this style. Demetrius's treatise did not gain the same success as Longinus’s On the Sublime. Although magnificence and the sublime both belong to the grand style, there are significant differences between them. Magnificence insists more on formal correctness and stylistic solemnity. Whereas the sublime inspires awe, veneration, loss of rationality, ecstasy, and pathos, the magnificent aims to impress without causing fear or indignation.

The grand style of magnificence also entered terminological discourse of ancient Greek art criticism. The Greeks drew on rhetorical terminology to describe and evaluate sculpture, painting, and architecture. They applied the term magnificence to works of art that express grandeur and other lofty features.

According to Pliny the Elder, the grand style of magnificence can be appreciated in works such as the statue of Zeus by Phidias and Zeuxis’s painting of Zeus enthroned.

=== Vitruvius and the magnificence of Roman architecture ===
In his monumental De architectura, Vitruvius analyzed both the artistic-aesthetic and the philosophical-ethical aspects of magnificence and enshrined the concept in classical architecture. In the sixth book, Vitruvius argues that the client (public or private) is magnificent because the beauty of a building depends on its cost. The materials employed should be of the best quality and the most beautiful, which means that they are usually the most expensive. Thus, for Vitruvius magnificence is not only a typical artistic and aesthetic feature of architecture, but is also connected to the social and political prestige of the client. Architecture becomes the means by which a public or private sponsor of a building can display his honor.

It is no surprise that ancient Romans granted such importance to public architecture: even the ancient historians and geographers celebrated the Romans’ ability to create buildings that were not only useful but also beautiful and magnificent. Dionysius of Halicarnassus states that the three greatest examples of magnificent Roman architecture were the aqueducts, the roads, and the sewage system. Strabo and Livy celebrate the hygienic functions of the aqueducts and the cloacae. Pliny the Elder provides a moving description of the engineering skills used to rebuild Rome's great sewage system, the Cloaca Maxima, which is still in use today.

== Magnificence in the Middle Ages ==
=== Thomas Aquinas ===
Thomas Aquinas left one of the most significant medieval interpretations of the concept of magnificence, drawing on the Graeco-Roman tradition and blending it with Christian precepts. He brings together the pagan idea of human magnificence with the Jewish-Christian mentality, according to which mankind should always be reverent towards God. In the Summa theologiae magnificence is a virtue that belongs to God, which can also be shared by men. Aquinas adopts Cicero's definition of magnificence, highlighting how it consists in doing great things. Magnificence belongs to the virtue of fortitude, or courage, because it regards the undertaking of great things and actions, and persevering even when circumstances can make their realization arduous.

=== Dante Alighieri ===
Dante, drawing on Aquinas, regards magnificence as a divine virtue connected to God's grandeur and perfection. Then, following the traditions of Aristotle and Aquinas, Dante classifies magnificence as the fourth virtue "which regulates great expenditures, in administering them and setting limits to their size".

== Magnificence in Renaissance Italy ==
With the advent of the Renaissance in Italy, magnificence underwent a deep transformation, drawing on this cultural movement that supported the rebirth of both classical culture and urban centers. The idea of magnificence and its representation had profound implications for Renaissance society in Italy.

=== Magnificence as a civic virtue ===
During the renewal of Italian cities as cultural and political hubs, magnificence gained fresh significance. This mirrors the transformation of traditional political structures and the rise of a novel civic culture rooted in virtues that differed from earlier feudal norms. A new idea of human excellence emerged, distinct from medieval aristocratic privileges connected to birth and rank. Marsilio Ficino in his work De virtutibus morabilus (1457) asserted that magnificence is the supreme virtue because it expresses God's greatness. Cristoforo Landino in De vera nobilitate (1487) described magnificence as an aspect of fortitude. This evolving perspective on nobility highlights the actions and achievements of people whose conduct centers on nurturing such virtues, rather than relying solely on noble lineage and aristocratic ideals.

=== Magnificence and patronage in Renaissance Italy ===
By the first half of the 15th century, magnificence had become a well-known and highly practiced virtue in Renaissance Italy. Wealthy citizens adopted the custom of spending large sums of money on building projects and on patronage of architecture and the arts. In Florence, Cosimo de' Medici (the founder of the Medici dynasty) practiced the virtue of magnificence from the 1430s onwards, and many other ruling families and distinguished citizens followed suit all over Italy. Lorenzo de’ Medici gained the title “magnificent” due to his support to humanist scholars and artists, establishing one of the most sophisticated courts in Italy.

Magnificence regained its ancient splendor as an aspect of works of architecture and art. The rediscovery of ancient rhetoric and the pre-eminence given to Vitruvius throughout the Renaissance influenced not only patrons’ tastes but also those of the architects and artists who were commissioned to create magnificent masterpieces that would give fame both to themselves and to the entire town. In De re aedificatoria, Leon Battista Alberti drew on both the philosophical and aesthetic concepts of magnificence. Many Italian Renaissance architects and artists applied magnificence both in their artworks and in their writings. Antonio Averlino (known as Filarete), Giorgio Vasari, and Andrea Palladio extolled the philosophical and aesthetic aspects of magnificence.

Magnificence was not only engaged in by distinguished citizens, princes, popes, architects, and artists but was also analyzed by humanist scholars. In Naples, the humanist and poet Giovanni Pontano wrote a philosophical and ethical treatise De magnificentia (1498). Magnificence was connected with the employment of wealth on behalf of the Neapolitan kings and aristocracy, and their lifestyles. Pontano's De magnificentia and his other philosophical treatises on the use of wealth and the role of the prince probably anticipated the courtier's ethic and the doctrine of how to behave appropriately, which would find the most mature expression in 16th-century Italian literature thanks to Baldassare Castiglione’s Book of the Courtier (1528) and Giovanni Della Casa’s Il Galateo (1558).

== Magnificence in the eighteenth century ==
=== Giovanni Battista Piranesi ===
By the 18th century, Italy had become one of the main destinations of the Grand Tour visitors, who came from Northern Europe to study and admire Italian art and architecture and to absorb classical culture. With Giovanni Battista Piranesi (1720–1778), magnificence received one of its final interpretations in the Italian cultural context. Universally known as the etcher of the Prisons and the Views of Roman monuments, Piranesi was an eclectic personality, who pursued a wide range of interests; he had a prominent role within the Graeco-Roman debate. In this controversy he supported the superiority of the architects and designers of the Roman Empire and demonstrated the indigenous roots of Roman culture, arguing that the Romans had been influenced more by the Etruscans than the Greeks. In his polemical treatise Della Magnificenza ed Architettura de’ Romani (Concerning the Magnificence and Architecture of the Romans) (1761) Piranesi drew on the heritage of the philosophical, ethical, economic, and artistic aspects of the notion of magnificence. He controversially conceived magnificence as a virtue that was shared by the entire ancient Roman population. Furthermore, he argued that the Romans used the most advanced technical and hydraulic skills, and the finest materials available. They excelled in public buildings and proved they were better at them than the Greeks.
