= Henry Herbert, 4th Earl of Carnarvon =

British aristocrat (1831–1890)

The Right Honourable The Earl of Carnarvon KP PC DL FRS FSA
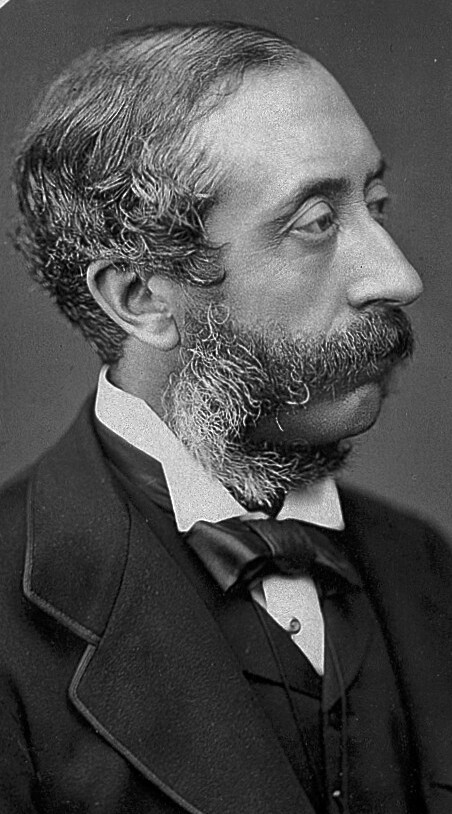

Lord Lieutenant of Hampshire
- In office 6 August 1887 – 29 June 1890
- Monarch: Victoria
- Preceded by: The Marquess of Winchester
- Succeeded by: The Earl of Northbrook

Secretary of State for the Colonies
- In office 6 July 1866 – 8 March 1867
- Monarch: Queen Victoria
- Prime Minister: The Earl of Derby
- Preceded by: Edward Cardwell
- Succeeded by: The Duke of Buckingham and Chandos
- In office 21 February 1874 – 4 February 1878
- Monarch: Queen Victoria
- Prime Minister: Benjamin Disraeli
- Preceded by: The Earl of Kimberley
- Succeeded by: Sir Michael Hicks Beach, Bt

Lord Lieutenant of Ireland
- In office 27 June 1885 – 28 January 1886
- Monarch: Queen Victoria
- Prime Minister: The Marquess of Salisbury
- Preceded by: The Earl Spencer
- Succeeded by: The Earl of Aberdeen

Personal details
- Born: 24 June 1831 Grosvenor Square, London
- Died: 29 June 1890 (aged 59) Portman Square, London
- Party: Conservative
- Spouses: Lady Evelyn Stanhope (m. 1861; died 1875) Elizabeth Howard (m. 1878–1890)
- Children: George Herbert, 5th Earl of Carnarvon; Winifred Gardner, Baroness Burghclere; Lady Margaret Duckworth; Lady Victoria Herbert; Hon. Aubrey Herbert; Hon. Mervyn Herbert
- Parent(s): Henry Herbert, 3rd Earl of Carnarvon; Henrietta Anna Howard
- Education: Christ Church, Oxford

Henry Howard Molyneux Herbert, 4th Earl of Carnarvon, KP, PC, DL, FRS, FSA (24 June 1831 – 29 June 1890), known as Lord Porchester from 1833 to 1849, was a British politician and a leading member of the Conservative Party. He was twice Secretary of State for the Colonies and also served as Lord Lieutenant of Ireland.

== Origins ==
Born at Grosvenor Square, London, Carnarvon was the eldest son and heir of Henry Herbert, 3rd Earl of Carnarvon (died 1849), by his wife Henrietta Anna Howard, a daughter of Lord Henry Howard-Molyneux-Howard, younger brother of Bernard Howard, 12th Duke of Norfolk. The Hon. Auberon Herbert was his younger brother.

== Youth ==
He was educated at Eton College. In 1849, aged 18, he succeeded his father in the earldom. He attended Christ Church, Oxford, where his nickname was "Twitters", apparently on account of his nervous tics and twitchy behaviour, and where in 1852 he obtained a first in literae humaniores.

== Early political career, 1854–1866 ==
Carnavon made his maiden speech in the House of Lords on 31 January 1854, having been requested by Lord Aberdeen to move the address in reply to the Queen's Speech. He served under Lord Derby, as Under-Secretary of State for the Colonies from 1858 to 1859, aged twenty-six.

In 1863 he worked on penal reform. Under the influence of Joshua Jebb he saw the gaols, (Note: "Gaol" is an older British English version of the American English "jail", more usually found in official documents and names of prisons in the United Kingdom, and Ireland. For example, Kilmainham Gaol, Reading Gaol, etc..) with a population including prisoners before any trial, as numerically more significant than the system of prisons for convicts. He was himself a magistrate, and campaigned for the conditions of confinement to be made less comfortable, with more severe regimes on labour and diet. He also wished to see a national system that was more uniform. In response, he was asked to run a House of Lords committee, which sat from February 1863. It drafted a report, and a Gaol Bill was brought in, during 1864; it was, however, lost amid opposition. The Prisons Act 1866, passed by parliament during 1865, saw Carnarvon's main ideas implemented, though with detailed amendments.

== Colonial Secretary and Canadian federation, 1866–1867 ==
In 1866 Carnarvon was sworn of the Privy Council and appointed Secretary of State for the Colonies by Derby. In 1867 he introduced the British North America Act, which conferred self-government on Canada, and created a federation. Later that year, he resigned (along with Lord Cranborne and Jonathan Peel) in protest against Benjamin Disraeli's Reform Bill to enfranchise the working classes.

== Colonial Secretary, 1874–1878 ==
Returning to the office of the British colonial secretary in 1874, he submitted a set of proposals, the Carnarvon terms, to settle the dispute between British Columbia and Canada over the construction of the transcontinental railroad and the Vancouver Island railroad and train bridge. Vancouver Island had been promised a rail link as a condition for its entry into Canadian Confederation.

=== South Africa ===
In the same year, he set in motion plans to impose a system of confederation on the various states of Southern Africa. The situation in southern Africa was complicated, not least in that several of its states were still independent and so required military conquest before being confederated. The confederation plan was also highly unpopular among ordinary southern Africans. The Prime Minister of the Cape Colony (by far the largest and most influential state in southern Africa) firmly rejected confederation under Britain, saying that it was not a model that was applicable to the diverse region, and that conflict would result from outside involvement in southern Africa at a time when state relations were particularly sensitive. The liberal Cape government also objected to the plan for ideological concerns; Its formal response, conveyed to London via Sir Henry Barkly, had been that any federation with the illiberal Boer republics would compromise the rights and franchise of the Cape's Black citizens, and was therefore unacceptable. Other regional governments refused even to discuss the idea. Overall, the opinion of the governments of the Cape and its neighbours was that "the proposals for confederation should emanate from the communities to be affected, and not be pressed upon them from outside."

According to historian Martin Meredith, Lord Carnarvon was primarily concerned with "imperial defence", and "regarded the Cape and its naval facilities at Simon's Bay as being the most important link in the imperial network". He thus decided to force the pace, "endeavouring to give South Africa not what it wanted, but what he considered it ought to want." He sent colonial administrators such as Theophilus Shepstone and Henry Bartle Frere to southern Africa to implement his system of confederation. Shepstone occupied and annexed the Transvaal in 1877, while Bartle Frere, as the new High Commissioner, led imperial troops against the last group of independent Xhosa in the Ninth Frontier War. Carnarvon then used the rising unrest to suspend the Natal constitution, while Bartle Frere overthrew the elected Cape government, and then moved to invade the independent Zulu Kingdom.

However the confederation scheme collapsed as predicted, leaving a trail of wars across Southern Africa. Humiliating defeats also followed at Isandlwana and Majuba Hill. Of the resultant wars, the initially disastrous invasion of Zululand ultimately ended in success, but the First Boer War of 1880 had even more far-reaching consequences for the subcontinent. Francis Reginald Statham, editor of The Natal Witness in the 1870s, famously summed up the local reaction to Carnarvon's plan for the region:

He (Carnarvon) thought it no harm to adopt this machinery (Canadian Confederation System) just as it stood, even down to the numbering and arrangement of the sections and sub-sections, and present it to the astonished South Africans as a god to go before them. It was as if your tailor should say – "Here is a coat; I did not make it, but I stole it ready-made out of a railway cloak-room, I don't know whether you want a coat or not; but you will be kind enough to put this on, and fit yourself to it. If it should happen to be too long in the sleeves, or ridiculously short in the back, I may be able to shift a button a few inches, and I am at least unalterably determined that my name shall be stamped on the loop you hang it up by.

The confederation idea was dropped when Carnarvon resigned in 1878, in opposition to Disraeli's policy on the Eastern Question, but the bitter conflicts caused by Carnarvon's policy continued, culminating eventually in the Second Boer War and the annexation of the two Boer republics.

== Lord Lieutenant of Ireland, 1885–1886 ==
On his party's return to power in 1885, Carnarvon became Lord Lieutenant of Ireland. His short period of office, memorable only for a conflict on a question of personal veracity between himself and Charles Stewart Parnell, as to his negotiations with the latter in respect of Home Rule, was terminated by another premature resignation. He never returned to office.

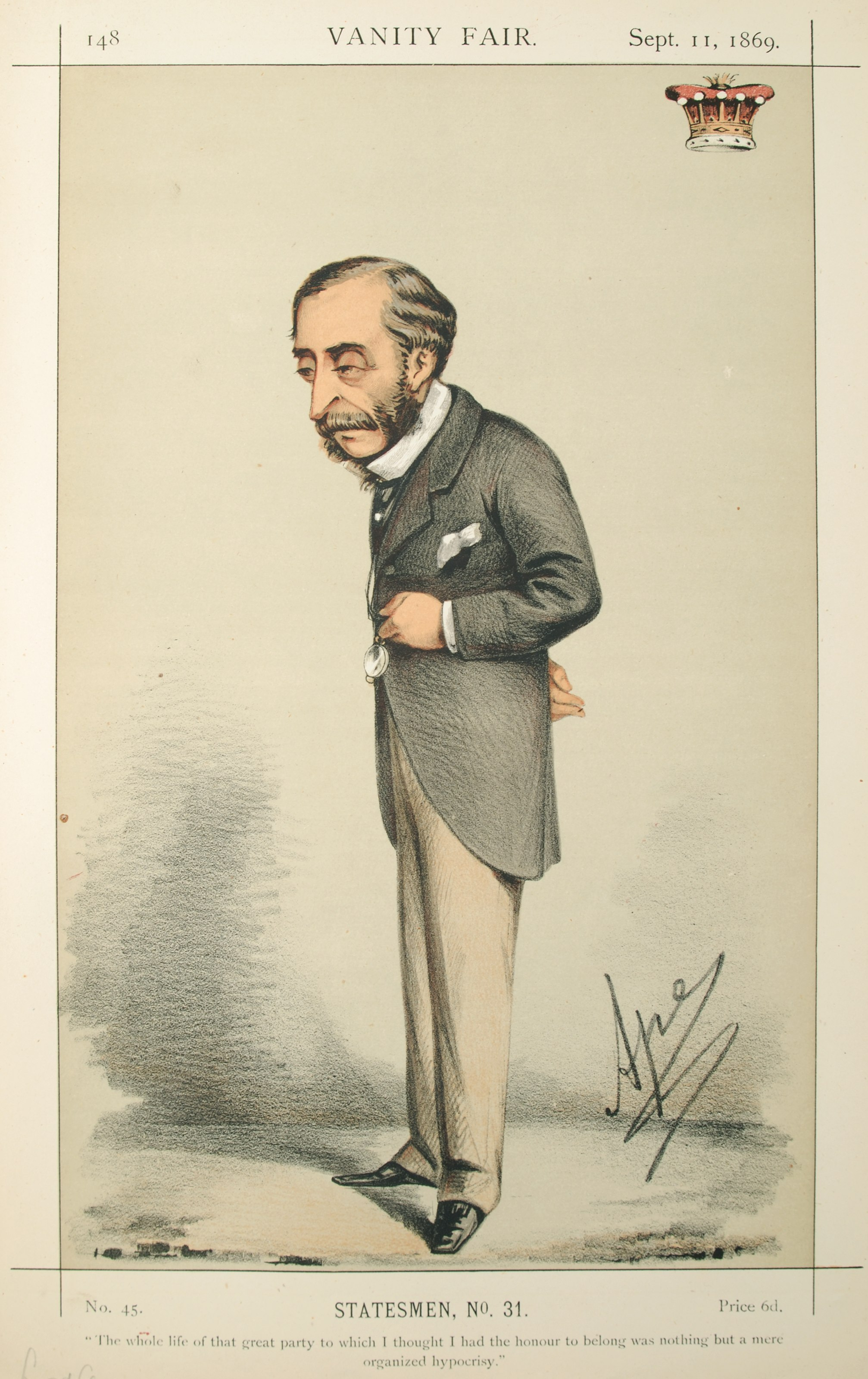
Herbert sketched in 1869 by "Ape" for Vanity Fair

== Other public appointments ==
Carnarvon also held the honorary posts of Lord Lieutenant of Hampshire between 1887 and 1890 and Deputy Lieutenant of Nottinghamshire. He was regarded as a highly cultured man and was a president and a fellow of the Society of Antiquaries (his time there noted for their campaign to save St Albans Cathedral from Lord Grimthorpe) and a Fellow of the Royal Society as well as high steward of Oxford University. He was also a prominent freemason, having been initiated in the Westminster and Keystone Lodge. He served as Pro Grand Master of the Grand Lodge of England from 1874 to 1890. With his permission a number of subsequently founded lodges bore his name in their titles.

== Some buildings commissioned by, associated with or overseen by Lord Carnarvon ==
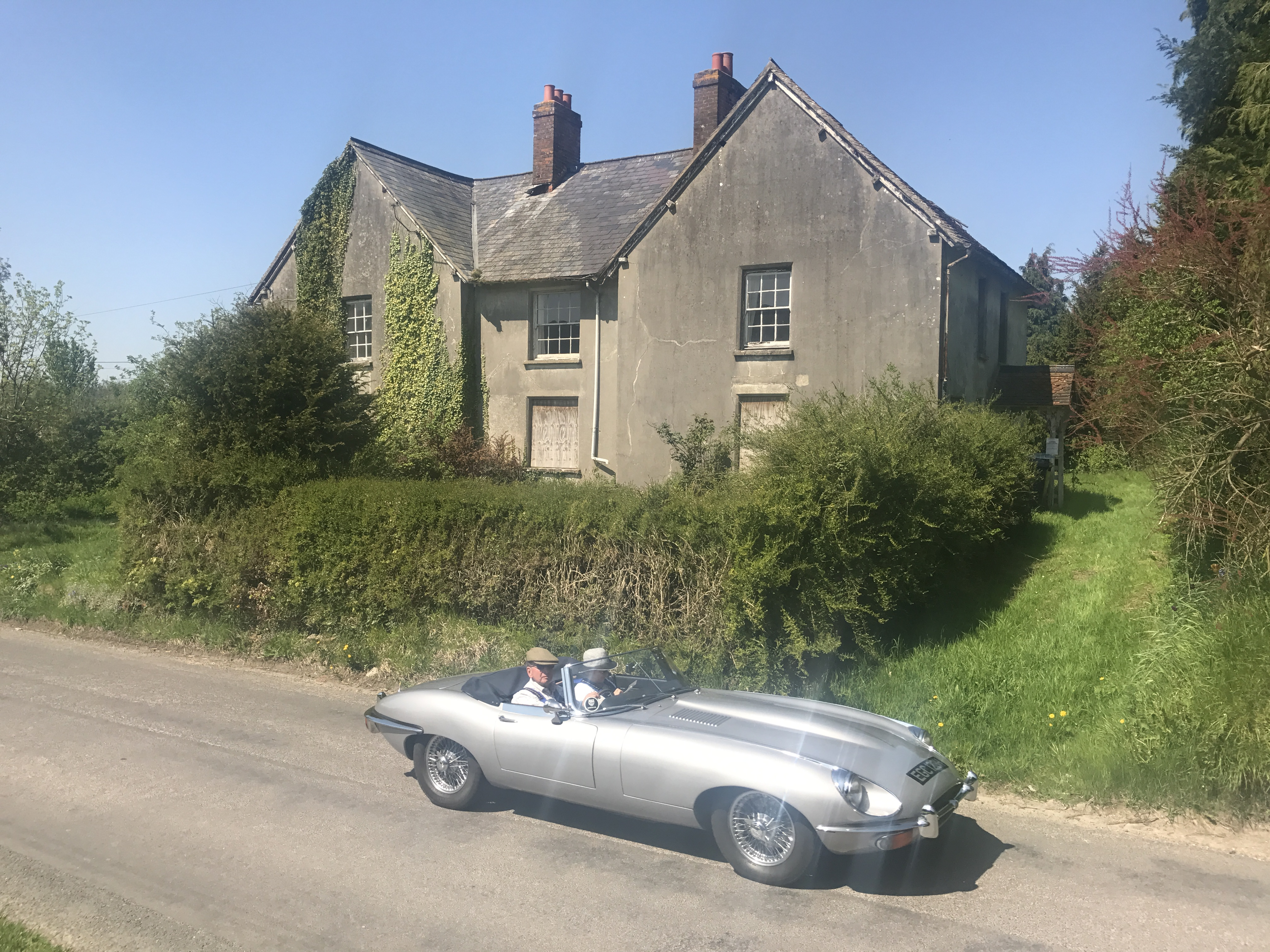
Concrete Cottages, Old Burghclere, before 1871. (Note: Long Piddle, Burghclere Bottom, Scouses Corner, on the north side of the Kingsclere and Sydmonton road, Old Burghclere.) Rare and pioneering concrete dwelling built for the magnificent 4th Earl of Carnarvon. Originally tripartite, they show both agricultural and urban Neo-Palladian traits.

Villa Altachiara or Villa Carnarvon, Portofino, Liguria, Italy, from a postcard made before 1900. Prince Frederick William of Prussia stayed there near the end of his life.

Carnarvon became a Freemason in 1856, joining the Westminster and Keystone Lodge, No. 10. In 1860 he was made the second Grand Master of the Grand Lodge of Mark Master Masons (created in 1856) and in 1870 he was appointed Deputy Grand Master of the United Grand Lodge of England (UGLE) by Lord Ripon, and was Pro Grand Master from 1874 to 1890. Furthermore, he was elected Fellow of the Royal Society in 1875, confirming, in addition to his work as a statesman, his interest in innovation, geometry, the Enlightenment, science, the Scientific Revolution and the world.

- 1855–1878: The Highclere mausoleum or chapel was built for Henrietta Anna, Countess of Carnarvon, in memory of his father and her husband, Henry Herbert, 3rd Earl of Carnarvon. Between 1839 and 1842, his father the third earl had employed Sir Charles Barry to turn the Georgian Highclere house into a Jacobethan castle. The interiors and west wing were carried out by Sir Charles Barry's assistant Thomas Allom who also provided the design of the funerary chapel-mausoleum. The entrance hallway-vestibule inside was designed by Sir Gilbert Scott. The work on the house was complete by 1878.
- 1869–1870: Church of St Michael and All Angels, Highclere, by Sir Gilbert Scott.
- 1870: Concrete Cottages, Long Piddle, Burghclere Bottom, Scouses Corner, Kingsclere or Sydmonton road, Old Burghclere. Rare and early concrete or mass concrete estate housing. The apparatus employed in the construction could have been that patented and manufactured by Messrs. Drake, Brothers, & Reid, of London, in 1868. Designed possibly by Thomas Robjohn Wonnacott or Charles Barry, Jr. (Note: The Drake Patent Concrete Building Company was founded in 1868.) (Around the same time, neighbouring landowner Lord Ashburton (Note: A cousin of Carnarvon's successor as Lord Lieutenant of Hampshire, Thomas Baring, 1st Earl of Northbrook.) and his clerk of works Thomas Potter, who wrote Concrete: its use in building and the construction of concrete walls, floors, etc., 1877, (Note: Potter's home at 22 Havelock Road, Croydon is still there) built at least one pair of concrete cottages in the Wiltshire villages of All Cannings and Steeple Langford.) Carnarvon had long been thinking about labourers' cottages and accompanying allotments. (Note: His late September 1866 address to the Highclere Agricultural Association at Burghclere on the subject of Labourers' Cottages in Ireland was reported in at least the Dublin Evening Mail and the Glasgow Herald.) The Reading Mercury reported the Burghclere project on Saturday, 30 October 1869:
  "BURGHCLERE – Considerable amount of interest has been excited in this locality on the subject of Cheap Dwellings for the Working Classes, owing to a report that the Earl of Carnarvon was about to start the new system of building houses in concrete. His Lordship has already commenced the erection of a block of three cottages at Burghclere Bottom, and no doubt the result will be anticipated with much interest both by landed proprietors and tenant farmers. This plan, if successful, will settle much controversy as to the predictability of building suitable farm cottages at a cheap rate, as up to this time cottages in brickwork do not afford interest on the capital expended. The work is to be done with Tall's Patent Concrete Machine, and is not expected to cost more than 6L. [£6] per rod standard thickness [a rod is 5 meters, or 5.5 yard, 16.5 feet]. Many buildings of various descriptions have already been erected on this principle throughout the country, and competent judges have pronounced them the exact kind of building that is wanted. They are said to have a neat appearance when completed, and are not only stronger and more durable than brickwork, but warmer and consequently more dry and healthy." Reading Mercury, Saturday, 30 October 1869.
- 1874–1881: Villa Altachiara ("Highclere" in Italian) (Villa Carnarvon) near Portofino, Liguria. A massive villa overlooking Portofino. It was still owned by the Herberts when Evelyn Waugh visited in 1936. (Note: Prince Frederick William of Prussia and Victoria, Princess Royal stayed there circa 1886. Elizabeth Chapin Patterson, daughter of Simeon B. Chapin, rented it for Meher Baba in July 1933. It is also associated with Norina Matchabelli, and Contessa Francesca Vacca Agusta, who died there. It is now owned by the footballer Samuel Eto'o.)

=== Estates and landholdings ===
Lord Carnarvon owned 35,583 acres (14,400 ha), which yielded an annual income of £37,211 during the early 1880s; his landholdings included 12,800 acres (5,200 ha) in Somerset, 13,247 acres (5,361 ha) in Nottinghamshire, and 9,340 acres (3,780 ha) in Hampshire.

== Marriages and issue ==
Lord Carnarvon married twice. His first marriage was in 1861 to Lady Evelyn Stanhope (1834–1875), daughter of George Stanhope, 6th Earl of Chesterfield, and Hon. Anne Elizabeth Weld-Forester, by whom he had one son and three daughters:

- Lady Winifred Anne Henrietta Christina Herbert (2 July 1864 – 28 September 1933); married as her second husband Herbert Gardner, 1st Baron Burghclere, and was the mother of Evelyn Gardner, who married the novelist Evelyn Waugh. Evelyn Gardner's marriage soon ended in divorce and, despite the opposition of the Herbert family, Waugh remarried to her half first cousin Laura Herbert, a daughter of Aubrey Herbert of Pixton, a son of the 4th Earl by his second wife.
- George Herbert, 5th Earl of Carnarvon (1866–1923), eldest son and heir, the financial backer of the excavation of the tomb of Tutankhamun;
- Lady Margaret Georgina Eveline Selina Herbert (18 September 1870 – 13 September 1958); married Sir George Herbert Duckworth, a notable civil servant and half-brother of the novelist Virginia Woolf and of the artist Vanessa Bell.
- Lady Victoria Alexandrina Mary Cecil Herbert (30 December 1874 – 15 November 1957); died unmarried

Following his first wife's death in 1875, Lord Carnarvon married his first cousin Elizabeth Catherine Howard (1857–1929) in 1878. She was a daughter of Henry Howard of Greystoke Castle, near Penrith, Cumberland (brother of Henrietta Anna Molyneux-Howard (1804–1876), wife of Henry Herbert, 3rd Earl of Carnarvon), a son of Lord Henry Howard-Molyneux-Howard and younger brother of Bernard Howard, 12th Duke of Norfolk. Elizabeth Howard's brother was Esmé Howard, 1st Baron Howard of Penrith. By his second wife he had two further sons:

- Hon. Aubrey Nigel Henry Molyneux Herbert (1880–1923), of Pixton Park in Somerset and of Teversal, in Nottinghamshire, soldier, diplomat, traveller, intelligence officer associated with Albanian independence and Conservative Member of Parliament for Yeovil. His daughter Laura Herbert was the second wife of Evelyn Waugh.
- Hon. Mervyn Robert Howard Molyneux Herbert (1882–1929), of Tetton, Kingston St Mary, Somerset, third son (second son by second wife), a diplomat and cricketer. Tetton was a former Acland property bequeathed to him by his father.

== Death and burial ==
Lord Carnarvon died in June 1890, aged 59, at Portman Square in London. His second wife survived him by almost forty years and died in February 1929, aged 72.

== Notes ==
Political offices
Preceded by Chichester Fortescue	Under-Secretary of State for the Colonies; 1858–1859	Succeeded by Chichester Fortescue
Preceded by Edward Cardwell	Secretary of State for the Colonies; 1866–1867	Succeeded by The Duke of Buckingham and Chandos
Preceded by The Earl of Kimberley	Secretary of State for the Colonies; 1874–1878	Succeeded by Sir Michael Hicks-Beach, Bt
Preceded by The Earl Spencer	Lord Lieutenant of Ireland; 1885–1886	Succeeded by The Earl of Aberdeen
Honorary titles
Preceded by The Marquess of Winchester	Lord Lieutenant of Hampshire; 1887–1890	Succeeded by The Earl of Northbrook
Peerage of Great Britain
Preceded by Henry John Herbert	Earl of Carnarvon; 1849–1890	Succeeded by George Herbert
