= Old Burghclere =

Coordinates: 51.31°N 01.34°W

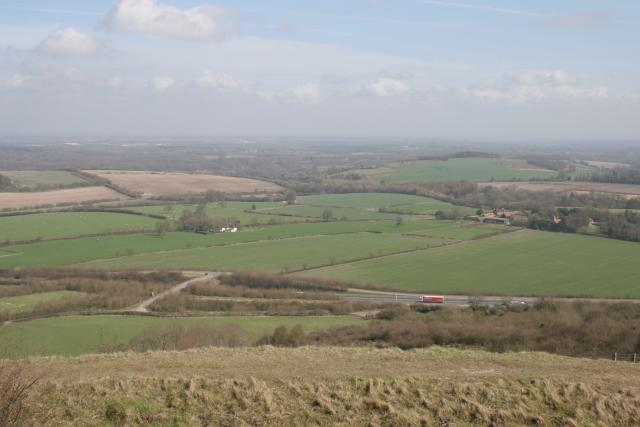
- From half-way up Beacon Hill looking north-east across the major road junction and Old Burghclere village to the right.

- Location within Hampshire
- OS grid reference: SU4657
- Civil parish: Burghclere
- District: Basingstoke and Deane
- Shire county: Hampshire
- Region: South East
- Country: England
- Sovereign state: United Kingdom
- Post town: Newbury
- Postcode district: RG20
- Dialling code: 01635
- Police: Hampshire and Isle of Wight
- Fire: Hampshire and Isle of Wight
- Ambulance: South Central
- UK Parliament: North West Hampshire

Old Burghclere is a village in Hampshire, England, located south of Newbury near the A34 road.

Burghclere has been known variously as: Clere Episcopi, Burcler (xiii cent.); Bisshopesclere, Bourghclere, Burghclere (xiv cent.); Boroughclere, Burghcleere, Boroweclere, Burcleare (xvi cent.); Burroughclere, Borough Cleere, and Burgh Cleere (xvii cent.).

Burghclere is a parish five miles west of Kingsclere, and is immediately adjacent to Highclere, which is on its western boundary. In the heart of Old Burghclere stands the old church of All Saints, and close by is Burghclere Manor House, which was formerly the rectory. Burghclere Farm is north of the old church.

In 1233 the common fields (campi) of Burghclere comprised Stock (67½ acres), Surlande (31½ acres), Harebert and Leylie (242 acres), Lendecumbe (151 acres), as well as 10 acres of meadow dispersed over the manor. These commons were inclosed in 1783.

The southern part of the parish (Old Burghclere) is open down country. Beacon Hill, which is 842 feet above the ordnance datum, is here a conspicuous landmark, upon which are the remains of an ancient earthwork. Down Farm lay east of the hill close to the former Burghclere Railway Station run by the Didcot Newbury and Southampton railway, which ran almost due north from here through the parish.

The total acreage of the parish of Burghclere is 5,269 acres, of which 1,740 acres are arable land, 2,174 acres permanent grass and 500 acres woods and plantations (1911). The chief crops are wheat, barley and oats (1911); the soil varies, being chiefly gravel and chalk, the subsoil chalk and greensand.

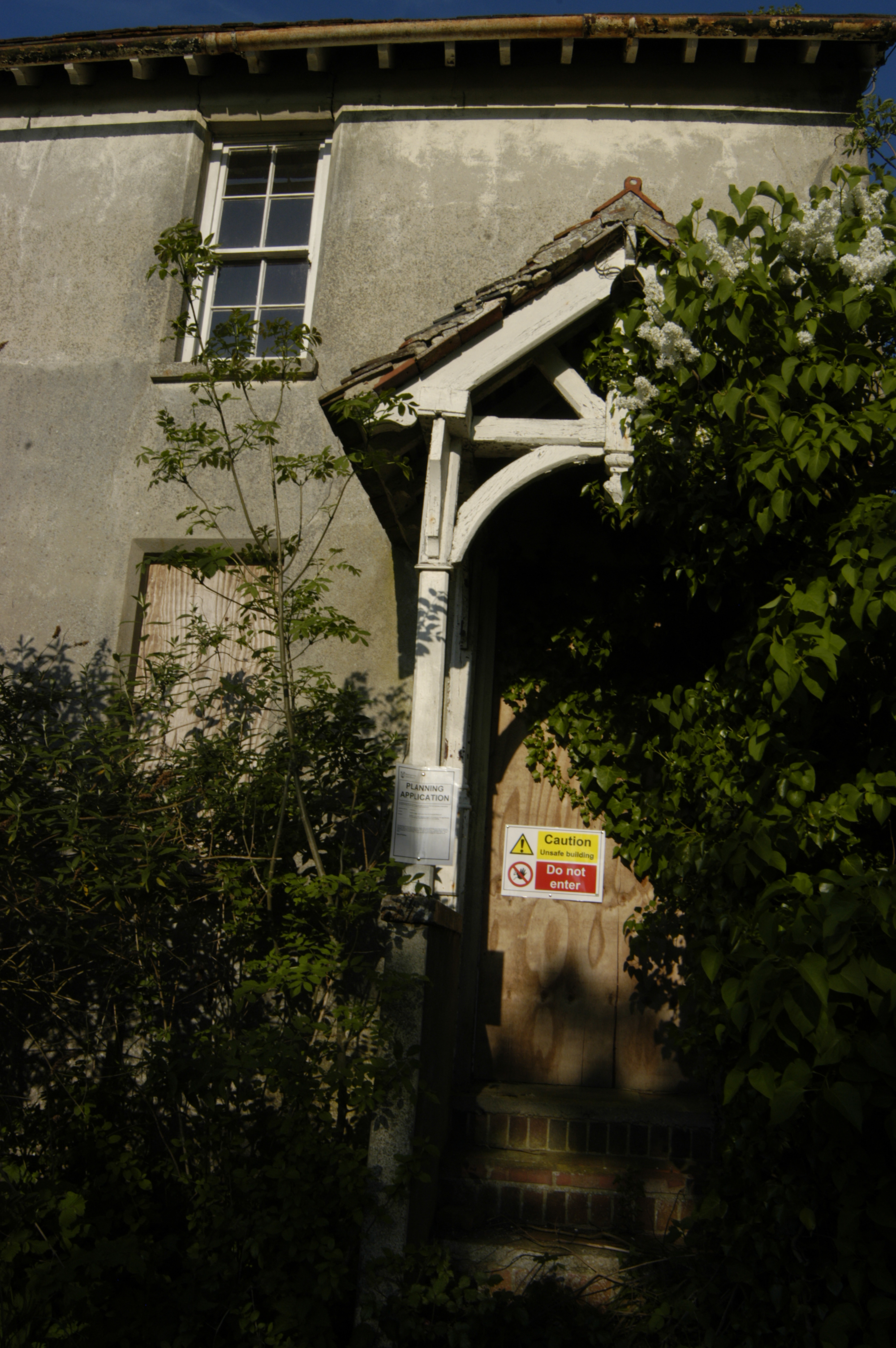
Concrete Cottages, western porch (before 1871), May 2018. Possibly designed by Charles Barry Junior (1823–1900) or Thomas Robjohns Wonnacott (1834–1918), RIBA, of Farnham. Probably built using Charles Drake's 'The Drake Patent Concrete Building Company' 1868 concrete patent. For Henry Herbert, 4th Earl of Carnarvon.

== Owners ==
Burghclere remained in the possession of the see of Winchester until 1551. The most notable Bishops of Winchester being William of Wykeham (1320 or 1324–1404), who founded New College, Oxford, and New College School in 1379, and Winchester College in 1382, but also owned, in his own right, Earlstone manor in the parish of Burghclere. William Waynflete, Lord Chancellor of England (1456–1460) and founder of Magdalen School and College in Oxford was also particularly renowned. In 1551 Edward VI received it from John Ponet, Bishop of Winchester, in exchange for lands elsewhere. King Edward VI granted it to William FitzWilliam in the same year, 1551, and although, under Philip and Mary, John White, the then Bishop of Winchester, was reinstated in 1557, William Fitz William died seised in 1559, leaving four daughters as his heirs. Of these Mabel, the eldest, was married to Sir Thomas Browne, and Katharine to Christopher Preston, 4th Viscount Gormanston; the two younger, both called Elizabeth, subsequently married Francis Jermy and Innocent Rede (Reade) respectively.

Sir William bequeathed the manor to his wife Jane (died 1575) for life, and after her death to his three younger daughters, whose respective husbands are found each holding a third part; in 1568 Innocent Rede (Reade) and Elizabeth his wife conveyed a third part of the manor to Hugh Hare, in 1569 Francis Jermy was concerned in the conveyance of a third, and in 1576 Christopher Viscount Gormanston held a third. In 1577 Richard Kingsmill (MP) acquired by fines the whole manor which George Kingsmill, his brother, was holding for life at the time of Richard's death in 1600. Constance, only daughter and heir of Richard, married Sir Thomas Lucy, of Charlecote (county Warwicks), whom she survived, and on her death in January 1637 her son Sir Thomas Lucy inherited. In 1647 the manor was in possession of Spencer Lucy son and heir of Sir Thomas, and it passed with Highclere to his brother Richard, who owned the latter manor in 1667, and presented to the church of Burghclere in 1661. Ten years later the property was conveyed to Sir Robert Sawyer, who died seised of the manors of Burghclere and High Clere in 1692, leaving as heiress an only daughter, Margaret wife of Thomas, Earl of Pembroke, ancestor of the Earls of Carnarvon. Burghclere has largely remained in the possession of the same family since this date, Henry Herbert, 1st Earl of Carnarvon inheriting by the will of his uncle, the Hon Robert Sawyer Herbert, second son of Thomas Herbert, 8th Earl of Pembroke, and in 1911 was in the hands of George Edward Stanhope, fifth earl.

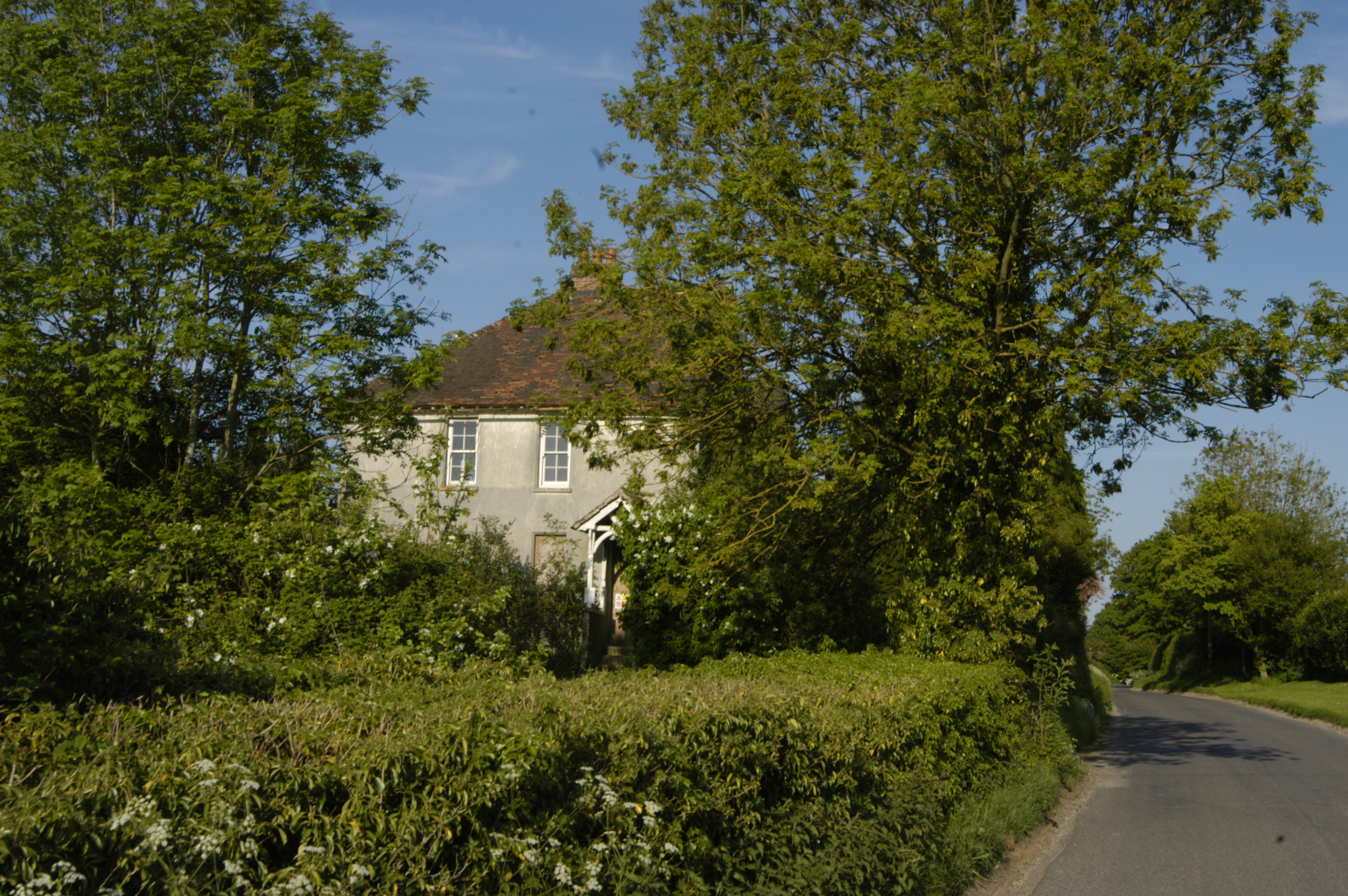
Concrete Cottages, Burghclere Bottom, (built before 1871), from the west looking along the Kingsclere Road, May 2018.

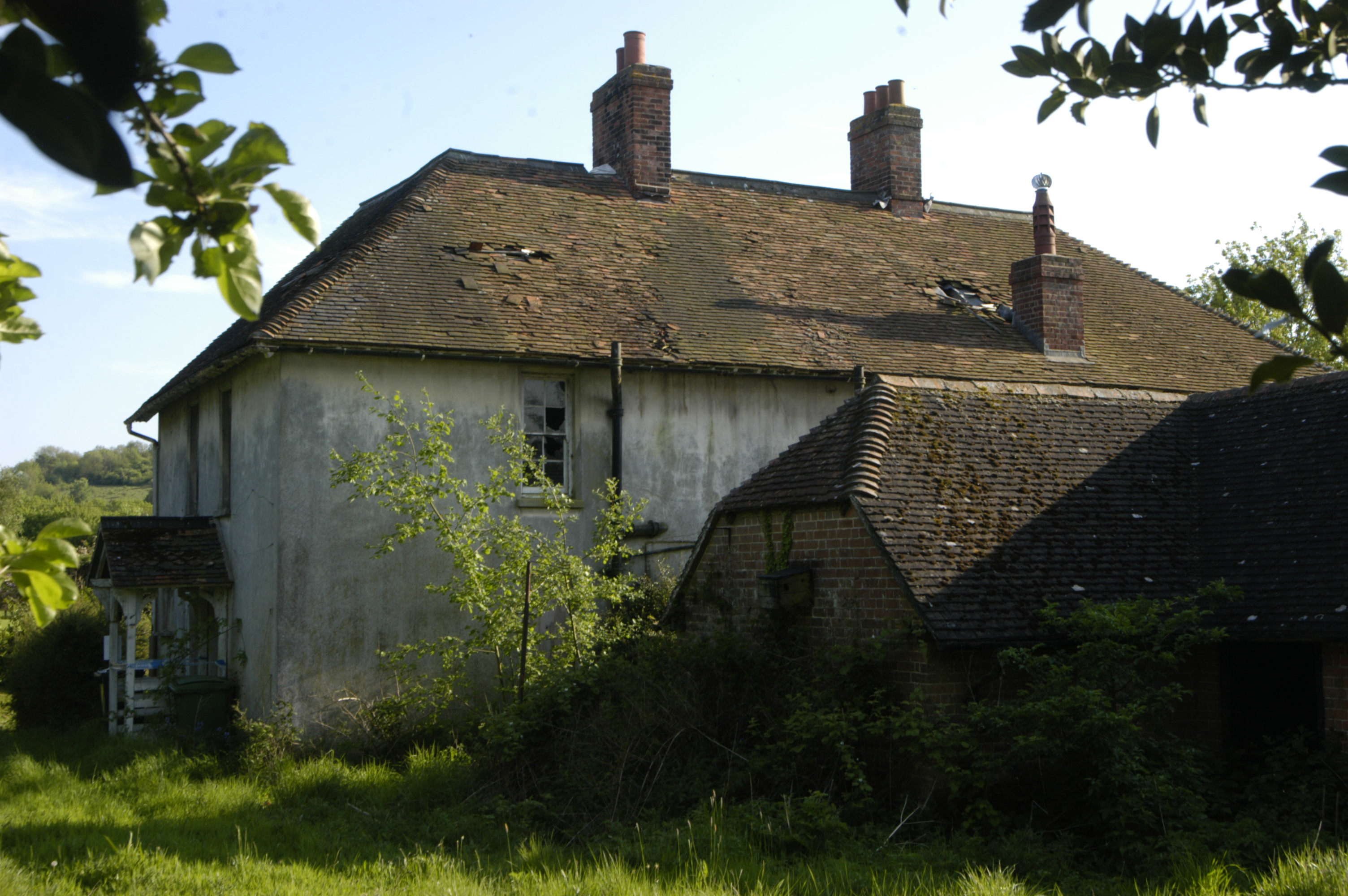
The impressive Concrete Cottages (before 1871), from the north, May 2018.

== Governance ==
The village is part of the civil parish of Burghclere and is part of the Burghclere, Highclere and St Mary Bourne ward of Basingstoke and Deane borough council. The borough council is a Non-metropolitan district of Hampshire County Council.

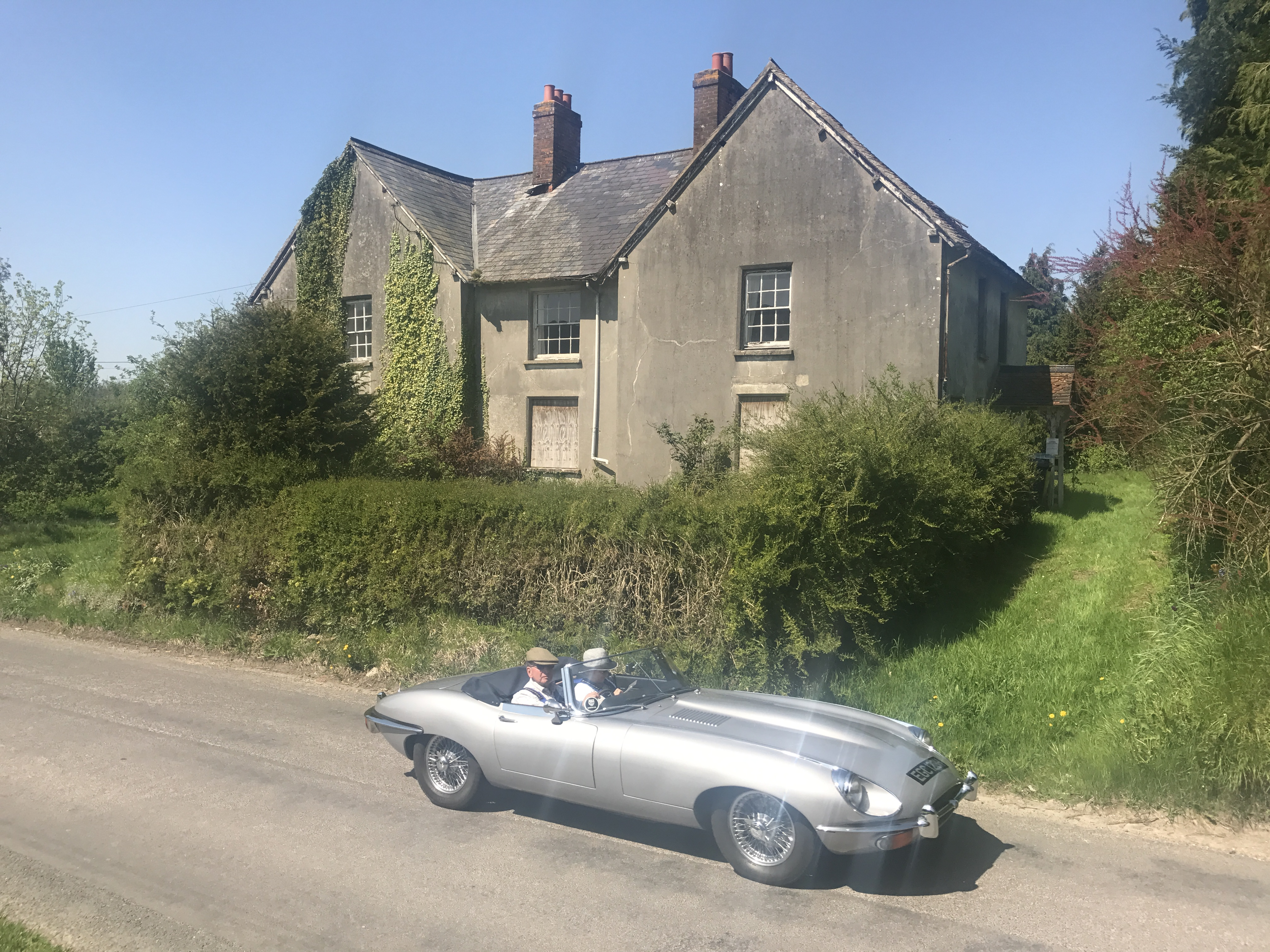
Concrete Cottages (before 1871), Burghclere Bottom, Scouses Corner, on the north side of the Kingsclere and Sydmonton road. Rare and pioneering (because such use of concrete was only patented in 1868, assuming it was Charles Drake's Building Apparatus) concrete dwelling built for the magnificent Henry Herbert, 4th Earl of Carnarvon. As seen with Jaguar E-Type, May 2018. Originally tripartite they show both agricultural and urban Neo-Palladian traits.

== Notable Buildings ==
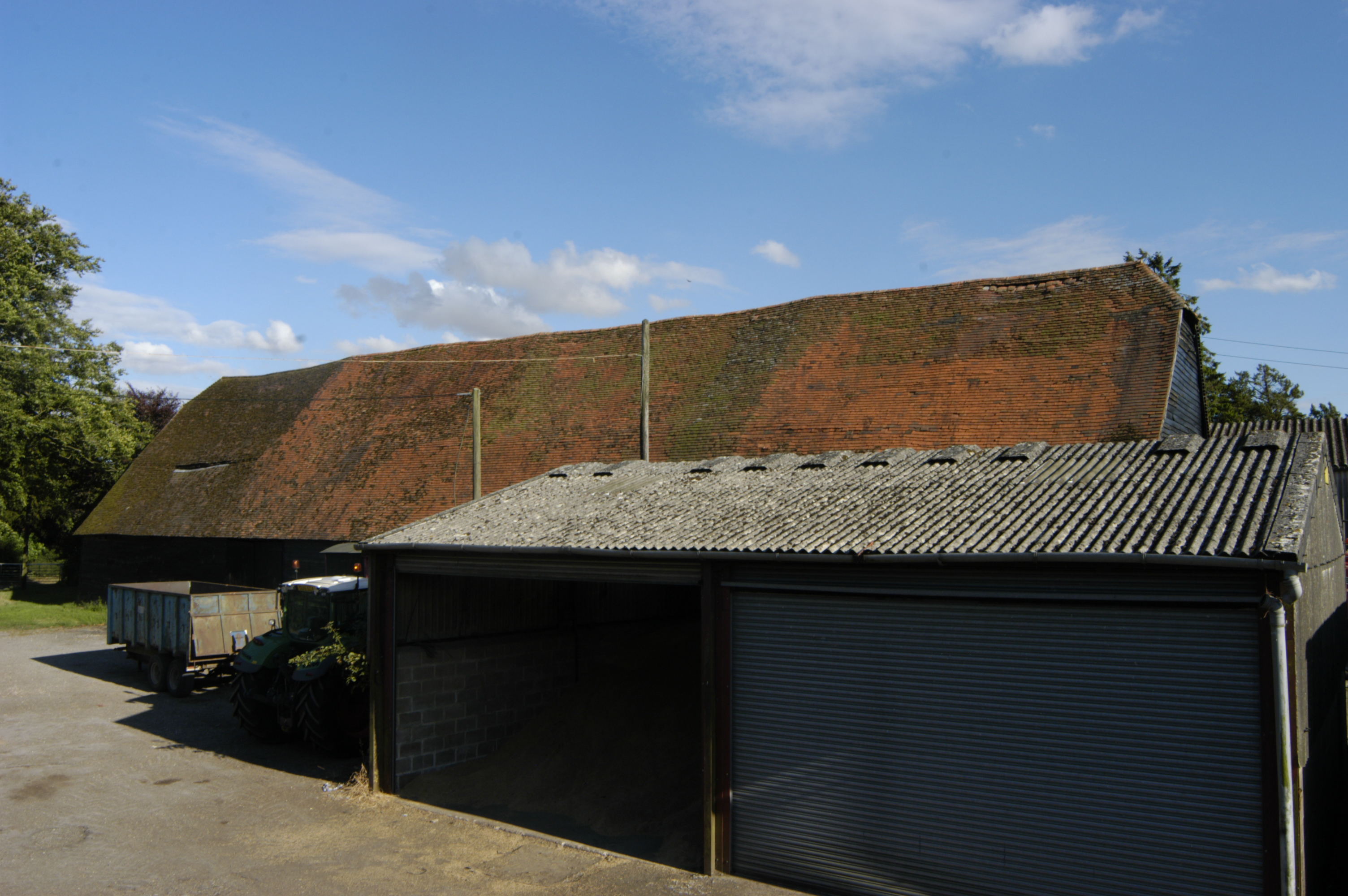
The monumental Manor Barn (with tiled roof), Old Burghclere, an eight-bay, aisled barn with two porches. For the Bishopric of Winchester, 1451–1453. (July 2015).

- Church of All Saints, Old Burghclere, c.1100 (Grade I listed, 1966). During its 1861 restoration a painting of the Martyrdom of Saint Sebastian was found over the chancel arch, but was not reinstated;
- Former rectory house, now The Manor House, Old Burghclere. The central hall range has timber with felling dates of Winter 1328/9. In 1861 the Rector was resident, George Wallace;
- Manor Barn, Old Burghclere is an 8-bay, aisled threshing barn with two porches (Grade I listed, 1984). Documentary sources record payment to a carpenter to build a barn of eight bays and two porches at Old Burghclere in 1451/52-1453, during the time of the bishop of Winchester William Waynflete. It is similar to the great barn at Harmondsworth, which is 25 years earlier and four bays longer. Both are associated with Winchester and William of Wykeham (1320 or 1324 – 27 September 1404). Harmondsworth was part of Winchester College and New College, Oxford's Wykehamist endowment;
- Manor Farm. The tenant farmer in 1851 was John Cozens, with 1,100 acres, and 24 labourers. In 1861 the farmer was Samuel Wentworth, 51, and 18 were housed, listed as farmer of 1,350 acres employing 40 mean and 10 boys. Sam Wentworth, 32, younger, was there in 1871 1,336 acres, 27 labourers and nine boys, housing 11, and in 1881 the younger Sam Wentworth was still listed as the farmer of 1,380 acres employing 29 men and boys. He was still there aged 72 with his wife in 1911.
- Concrete Cottages (1870), in the former Long Piddle, Burghclere Bottom, Scouses Corner, on the north side of the Kingsclere and Sydmonton road. Rare and pioneering (because such use of concrete was only patented in 1864–1868). They were put up using Tall's patent shuttering, Tall's Concrete Moulding Machine or General Builder, aka Joseph Tall's Patent Concrete Machine, of Falstaff Yard, Kent street, Southwark. A concrete dwelling built for the magnificent Henry Herbert, 4th Earl of Carnarvon. Tripartite they show both agricultural and urban Neo-Palladian traits. Drake used designs by Charles Barry Junior (1823–1900) or Thomas Robjohns Wonnacott (1834–1918), RIBA, of Farnham but here the explicit designer is unclear. The Reading Mercury, Saturday, 30 October 1869, reported the building.

At the time of the 1871 census seven adults and five children were living in the terrace that was the Concrete Cottages.
These were:
- George Broadhurst (head, 27, groom), his wife (24, laundress) and George (5);
- George Ash (head, 35, agricultural labourer), Mary (28, wife), and children Julia (9), Emily (7), Henry (6), and George (1);
- Robert Breadman (head, 34, carter), Harriet (37, wife) and George White (39, brother-in-law).
In 1901 the census had 11 adults in three households:
- No.3: Frank (Francis) Witts (42, labourer on farm); Sarah (44), Annie (23), Bertie (Bertram) (18), Daisy (12), Gladys (8) and boarder Frank Annals (25, lime kiln labourer);
- No. 4: Mary Ashe (58, widow, a laundress) and Thomas Ashe (9, grandson);
- No. 5: George Cummins (44, agricultural labourer) and Sophia Cummins (37, wife).
The 1911 census listed 13 people in three households:
- Sarah Witts (54, widow), Bertram Witts (28, railway labourer), Daisy Fooks (22, daughter, married) and Reginald Fooks (1, grandson) [four rooms]
- John Appleby (39, horseman on farm) and Joanna (40, wife, born Nova Scotia), and sons John (14, on farm) George (12, at school), Albert (7), Percy (5), Robert (3) [four rooms]
- George (54, farm labourer) and Sophia Cummins (46, wife) [five rooms].

- Railway Station. Opened in 1885 by the Didcot, Newbury and Southampton Railway, originally named Sydmonton, subsequently Burghclere Station. While further from the village of Burghclere than Highclere railway station it was relatively busy, serving the larger village of Kingsclere. Closed in 1963, now a private residence.
