= Metella =

Metella may refer to:

- Caecilia Metella (disambiguation), several women born into the Caecilii Metelli family of ancient Rome
- Cornelia Metella (c. 73 BC–after 48 BC) final wife of Pompey the Great
- Malia Metella (born 1982), French swimmer, sister of Medhy
- Mehdy Metella (born 1992), French swimmer, brother of Malia

== See also ==
- Caecilii Metelli family tree
