= Religio =

Latin origin of the modern lexeme religion

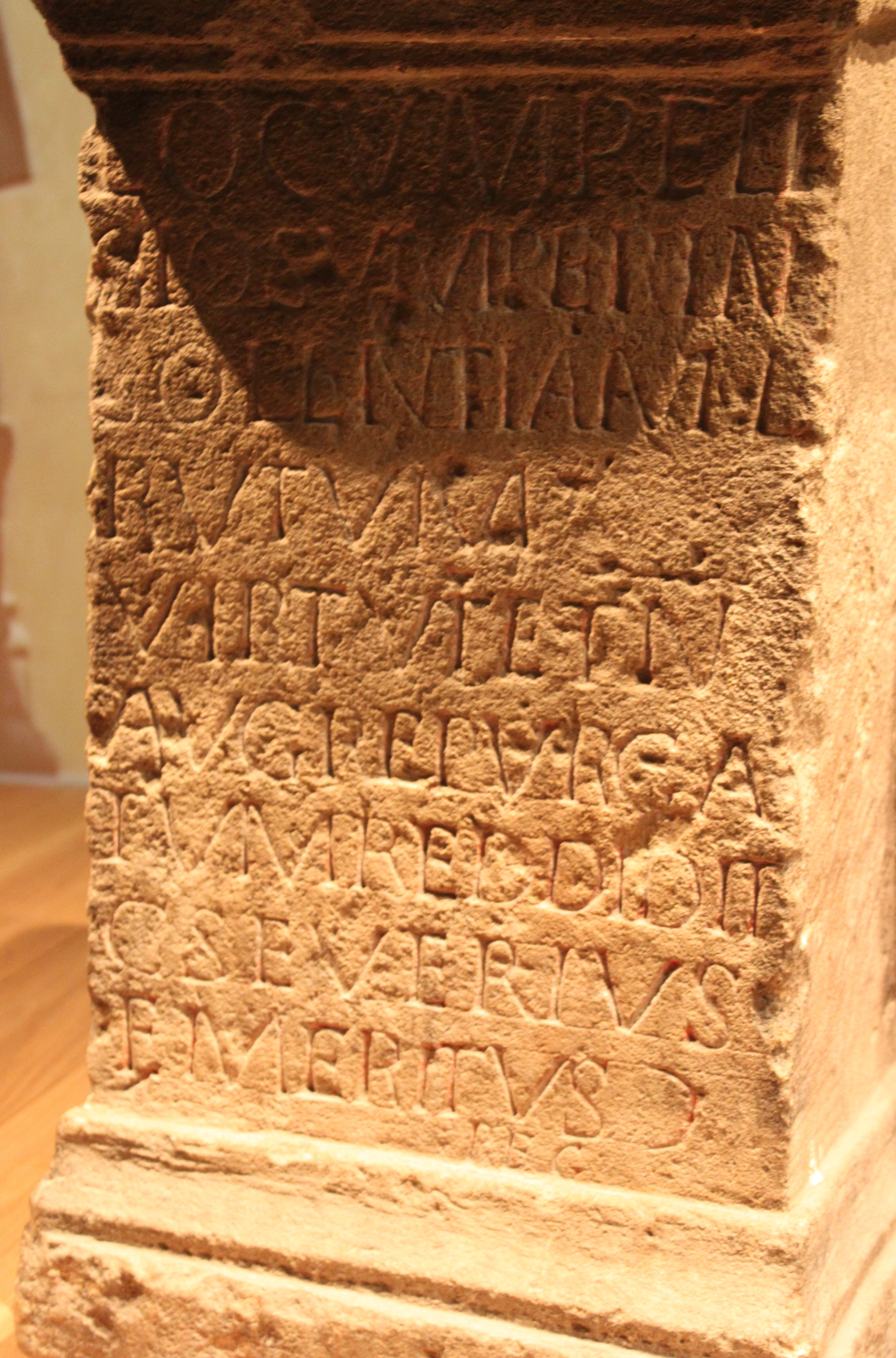
Dedication from Roman Britain announcing that a local official has restored a locus religiosus

The Latin term religiō, the origin of the modern lexeme religion (via Old French/Middle Latin), is of ultimately obscure etymology. It is recorded beginning in the 1st century BC, i.e. in Classical Latin at the end of the Roman Republic, notably by Cicero, in the sense of "scrupulous or strict observance of the traditional cultus". In classic antiquity, it meant conscientiousness, sense of right, moral obligation, or duty towards anything and was used mostly in secular or mundane contexts. In religious contexts, it also meant the feelings of "awe and anxiety" caused by gods and spirits that would help Romans "live successfully".

== Etymology ==
The classical etymology of the word, traced to Cicero in De Natura Deorum, II, 28, 72, derives it from relegere: re (again) + lego (read), meaning to go through or over again in reading, speech or thought. Modern scholars such as Tom Harpur and Joseph Campbell have argued that religio is derived from religare: re (again) + ligare (bind or connect), which was made prominent by Augustine of Hippo, following the interpretation of Lactantius in Divinae institutiones, IV, 28.

Newer research shows that in the ancient and medieval world, the etymological Latin root religio was understood as an individual virtue of worship in mundane contexts and never as doctrine, practice, or actual source of knowledge. In general, religio referred to broad social obligations towards anything including family, neighbors, rulers, and even towards God. Religio was most often used by the ancient Romans not in the context of a relation towards gods, but as a range of general emotions such as hesitation, caution, anxiety, fear; feelings of being bound, restricted, inhibited; which arose from heightened attention in any mundane context. The term was also closely related to other terms like scrupulus which meant "very precisely" and some Roman authors related the term superstitio, which meant too much fear or anxiety or shame, to religio at times. When religio came into English around the 1200s as religion, it took the meaning of "life bound by monastic vows" or monastic orders.

== Examples of usage ==
Cicero explained religio as a connection of re (again) with lego (read) in the sense of choose, go over again or consider carefully (applied to the proper performance of rites in veneration of the gods).

"The best and also the purest, holiest and most pious way of worshipping the gods is ever to venerate them with purity, sincerity and innocence both of thought and of speech. For religion has been distinguished from superstition not only by philosophers but by our ancestors. Persons who spent whole days in prayer and sacrifice to ensure that their children should outlive them were termed ‘superstitious’ (from superstes, a survivor), and the word later acquired a wider application. Those on the other hand who carefully reviewed and so to speak retraced all the lore of ritual were called ‘religious’ from relegere (to retrace or re-read), like ‘elegant’ from eligere (to select), ‘diligent’ from diligere (to care for), ‘intelligent’ from intellegere (to understand); for all these words contain the same sense of ‘picking out’ (legere) that is present in ‘religious.’ Hence ‘superstitious’ and ‘religious’ came to be terms of censure and approval respectively."

Julius Caesar used religio to mean "obligation of an oath" when discussing captured soldiers making an oath to their captors

"Thus the terror raised by the generals, the cruelty and punishments, the new obligation of an oath, removed all hopes of surrender for the present, changed the soldiers' minds, and reduced matters to the former state of war."

The Roman naturalist Pliny the Elder used the term religio to describe elephants' supposed veneration of the sun and the moon.

"The elephant is the largest of them all, and in intelligence approaches the nearest to man. It understands the language of its country, it obeys commands, and it remembers all the duties which it has been taught. It is sensible alike of the pleasures of love and glory, and, to a degree that is rare among men even, possesses notions of honesty, prudence, and equity; it has a religious respect also for the stars, and a veneration for the sun and the moon."

St. Augustine, following the interpretation given by Lactantius in Divinae institutiones, IV, 28 derived religio from re (again) and ligare bind, connect, probably from a prefix.

The medieval usage alternates with order in designating bonded communities like those of monastic orders: "we hear of the 'religion' of the Golden Fleece, of a knight 'of the religion of Avys'".

== Significance in Roman religion ==
Within the system of what is now called Roman religion (in the modern sense of the word), the term religio originally meant an obligation to the gods, something expected by them from human beings or a matter of particular care or concern as related to the gods, "reverence for God or the gods, careful pondering of divine things, piety".

In this sense, religio might be translated better as "religious scruple" than with the English word "religion". One definition of religio offered by Cicero is cultus deorum, "the proper performance of rites in veneration of the gods."

Religio among the Romans was not based on "faith", but on knowledge, including and especially correct practice. Religio (plural religiones) was the pious practice of Rome's traditional cults, and was a cornerstone of the mos maiorum, the traditional social norms that regulated public, private, and military life. To the Romans, their success was self-evidently due to their practice of proper, respectful religio, which gave the gods what was owed them and which was rewarded with social harmony, peace and prosperity.

Religious law maintained the proprieties of divine honours, sacrifice, and ritual. Impure sacrifice and incorrect ritual were vitia (faults, hence "vice," the English derivative); excessive devotion, fearful grovelling to deities, and the improper use or seeking of divine knowledge were superstitio; neglecting the religiones owed to the traditional gods was atheism, a charge leveled during the Empire at Jews, Christians, and Epicureans. Any of these moral deviations could cause divine anger (ira deorum) and, therefore, harm the State. See Religion in ancient Rome.

Religiosus was something pertaining to the gods or marked out by them as theirs, as distinct from sacer, which was something or someone given to them by humans. Hence, a graveyard was not primarily defined as sacer but a locus religiosus, because those who lay within its boundaries were considered belonging to the di Manes. Places struck by lightning were taboo because they had been marked as religiosus by Jupiter himself.
