= Magnanimity =

Virtue of being great of mind and heart

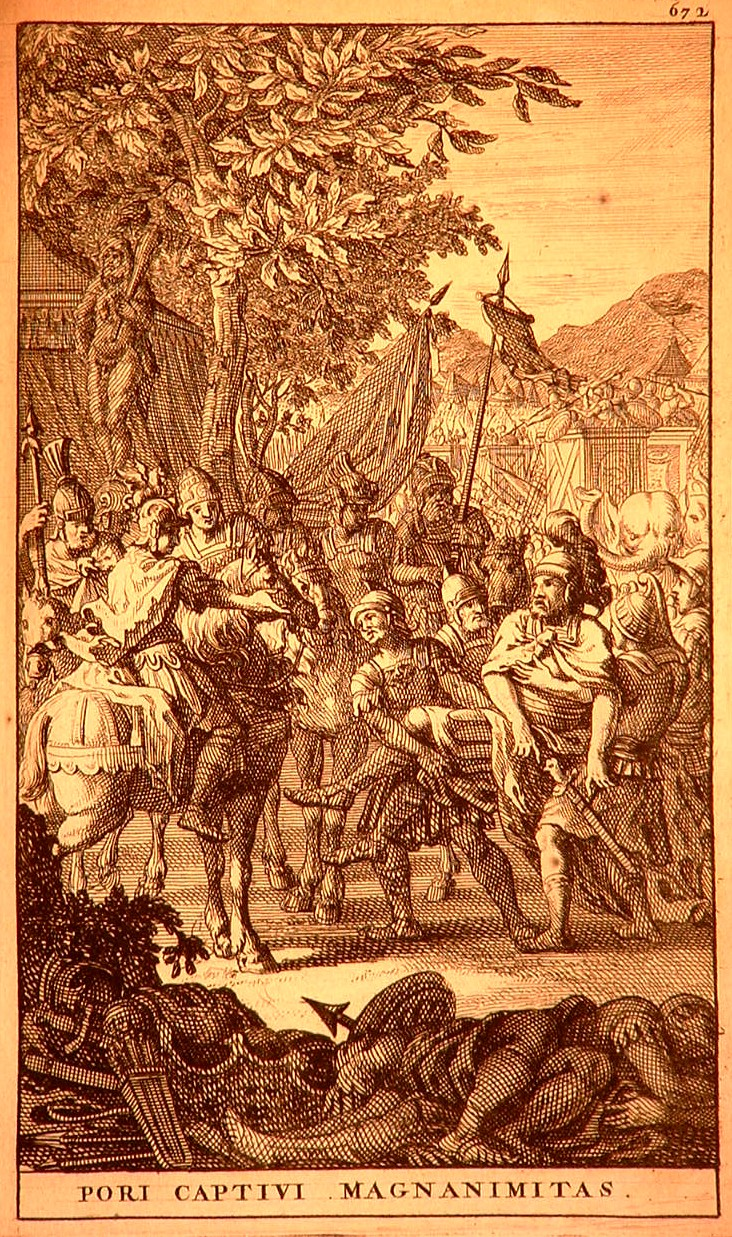
The magnanimity of Alexander towards the captive Porus.

Magnanimity (from Latin magnanimitās, from magna "big" + animus "soul, spirit") is the virtue of being great of mind and heart. It usually encompasses a refusal to be petty, a willingness to face danger, and actions for noble purposes. Its antithesis is pusillanimity (Latin: pusillanimitās). Although the word magnanimity has a traditional connection to Aristotelian philosophy, it also has its own tradition in English which now causes some confusion.

== Aristotle ==
The Latin word magnanimitās is a calque of the Greek word μεγαλοψυχία (megalopsychia), which means "greatness of soul". Aristotle associates megalopsychia more with a sense of pride and self-worth rather than the modern sense of magnanimity. He writes, "Now a person is thought to be great-souled if he claims much and deserves much" (δοκεῖ δὴ μεγαλόψυχος εἶναι ὁ μεγάλων αὑτὸν ἀξιῶν ἄξιος ὤν). Aristotle continues:

He that claims less than he deserves is small-souled... For the great-souled man is justified in despising other people—his estimates are correct; but most proud men have no good ground for their pride... It is also characteristic of the great-souled man never to ask help from others, or only with reluctance, but to render aid willingly; and to be haughty towards men of position and fortune, but courteous towards those of moderate station... He must be open both in love and in hate, since concealment shows timidity; and care more for the truth than for what people will think; and speak and act openly, since as he despises other men he is outspoken and frank, except when speaking with ironical self-deprecation, as he does to common people... He does not bear a grudge, for it is not a mark of greatness of soul to recall things against people, especially the wrongs they have done you, but rather to overlook them... Such then being the Great-souled man, the corresponding character on the side of deficiency is the Small-souled man, and on that of excess the Vain man.

W.D. Ross translates Aristotle's statement ἔοικε μὲν οὖν ἡ μεγαλοψυχία οἷον κόσμος τις εἶναι τῶν ἀρετῶν· μείζους γὰρ αὐτὰς ποιεῖ, καὶ οὐ γίνεται ἄνευ ἐκείνων as the following: "Pride [megalopsychia], then, seems to be a sort of crown of the virtues; for it makes them greater, and it is not found without them."

== Other uses ==
Noah Webster defined Magnanimity in this way:

Greatness of mind; that elevation or dignity of soul, which encounters danger and trouble with tranquility and firmness, which raises the possessor above revenge, and makes him delight in acts of benevolence, which makes him disdain injustice and meanness, and prompts him to sacrifice personal ease, interest and safety for the accomplishment of useful and noble objects.

— Noah Webster

Thomas Aquinas adopted Aristotle's concept while adding the Christian virtues of humility and charity.

Edmund Spenser, in The Faerie Queene, had each knight allegorically represent a virtue. Prince Arthur represented magnificence, which is generally taken to mean Aristotelian magnificence. The uncompleted work does not include Prince Arthur's book, and the significance is not clear.

Democritus states that "It is magnanimity to bear untowardness calmly".

Thomas Hobbes defines magnanimity as "contempt of little helps and hindrances" to one's ends. To Hobbes, contempt stands for an immobility of the heart, which is moved by other things and desires instead.

As an adjective, the concept is expressed as "magnanimous", e.g. "He is a magnanimous man." An example of referring to one as magnanimous can be seen in Hrólfs saga kraka where King Hrólfr Kraki changes the name of a court servant from Hott to Hjalti for his new-found strength and courage, after which Hjalti refuses to taunt or kill those who previously mocked him. Because of his noble actions, the king then bestows the title Magnanimous upon Hjalti.

C. S. Lewis, in his book The Abolition of Man, refers to the chest of man as the seat of magnanimity, or sentiment, with this magnanimity working as the liaison between visceral and cerebral man. Lewis asserts that, in his time, the denial of the emotions that are found in the eternal and sublime—that which is humbling as an objective reality—had led to "men without chests".
