= Virtus =

Masculine virtue in Ancient Rome

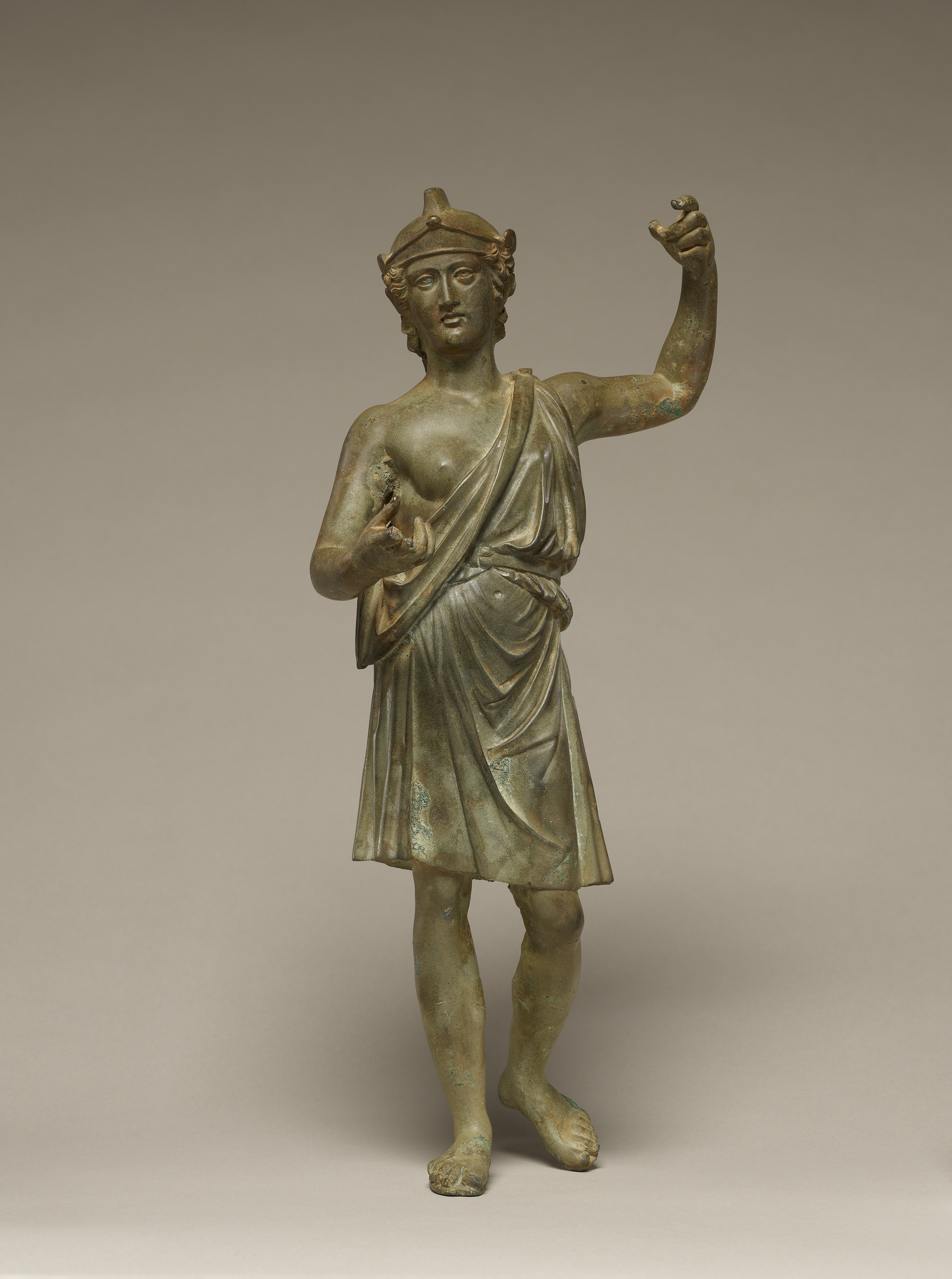
Bronze statuette of Roma or Virtus, 50–75 CE (Getty Villa)

Virtus (Classical Latin: [ˈwɪrtuːs̠]) was a specific virtue in ancient Rome that carried connotations of valor, masculinity, excellence, courage, character, and worth, all perceived as masculine strengths. It was thus a frequently stated virtue of Roman emperors, and was personified as the deity Virtus.

== Origins ==
The origins of the word virtus can be traced back to the Latin word vir, 'man'. The common list of attributes associated with virtus were considered to be particularly masculine strengths. From the early to the later days of the Roman Empire, there appears to have been a development in how the concept was understood.

Originally virtus described specifically martial courage, but it eventually grew to be used to describe a range of Roman virtues. It was often divided into different qualities including prudentia (practical wisdom), iustitia (justice), temperantia (temperance, self-control), and fortitudo (courage). This division of virtue as a whole into cardinal virtues is an ongoing project of positive psychology or, in philosophy, virtue ethics, following a tradition originating in Plato's Republic and Aristotle's Nicomachean Ethics. It implies a link between virtus and the Greek concept of arete.

At one time virtus extended to include a wide range of meanings that covered one general ethical ideal. The use of the word grew and shifted to fit evolving ideas of what manliness meant. Once, virtus meant primarily that a man was a brave warrior, but it came also to mean that he was a good man, someone who did the right thing. During the time of the decline of the Roman elite, the Roman upper class no longer thought of themselves as unmanly if they did not serve in the military.

== In Roman political philosophy ==
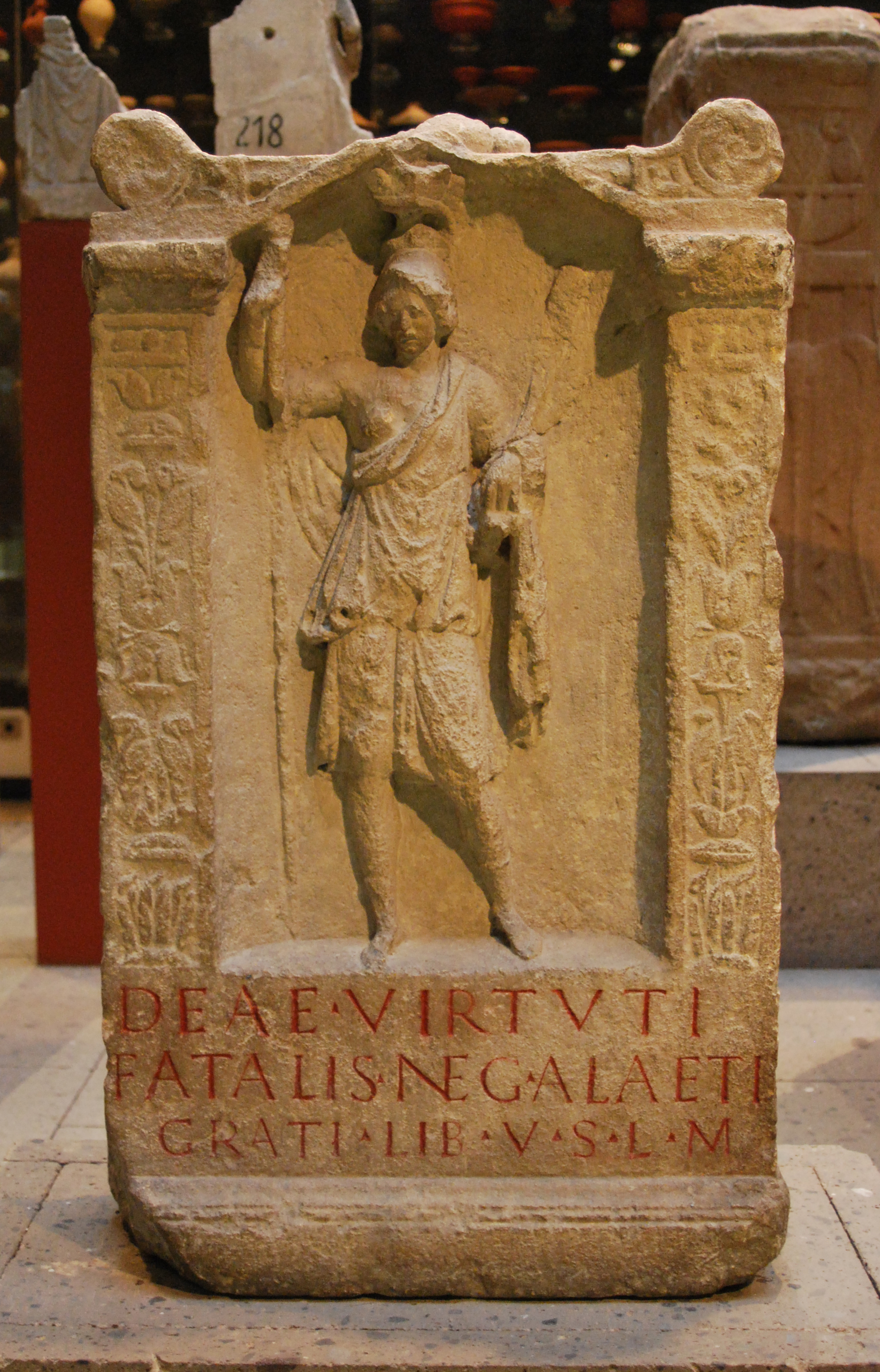
Sacrificial altar of the dea Virtus, 3rd century CE, Cologne, Germany

Virtus came from an aristocratic tradition in which it described a specific type of public conduct. It was mainly applicable to those in the cursus honorum, certainly by the late republic at least. It was not a "private" virtue in the way that modern people might consider it. Valor, courage, and manliness were not things to be pursued in the private sphere of the individual or the individual's private concerns. There could be no virtue in exploiting one's manliness in the pursuit of personal wealth, for example. Virtus was exercised in the pursuit of gloria for the benefit of the res publica resulting in the winning of eternal memoria. According to D.C. Earl, "Outside the service of the res publica there can be no magistratus and therefore, strictly speaking, no gloria, no nobilitas, no virtus."

The nobility of virtus lay not only in one's personal acta but also those of one's ancestors. However Cicero, a novus homo, asserted that virtus was a virtue particularly suited to the new man just as nobilitas was suited to the noble. Cicero argued that just as young men from noble families won the favor of the people so too should the novus homo earn the favor of the people with his virtus. He asserted that virtus, and not one's family history, should decide a man's worthiness. Because virtus is something that a man earns himself, not something that is given to him by his family, it is a better measure of a man's ability. Cicero's goal was not to impugn the noble class but widen it to include men who had earned their positions by merit.

The term virtus was used quite significantly by the historian Sallust, a contemporary of Cicero. Sallust asserted that virtus did not rightfully belong to the nobilitas as a result of their family background but specifically to the novus homo through the exercise of ingenium (talent, also means sharpness of mind, sagacity, foresight, and character). For Sallust and Cicero alike, virtus comes from winning glory through illustrious deeds (egregia facinora) and the observance of right conduct through bonae artes.

== Applicability ==
Virtus was not universally applicable—typically only adult male Roman citizens could be thought of as possessing virtus.

=== Women ===
Virtus was occasionally attributed to women, in spite of its association with vir. Cicero attributes virtus to women several times. He uses it once to describe Caecilia Metella when she helps a man who is being chased by assassins. (Note: There were several women called Caecilia Metella. Freese identifies her as the daughter of Quintus Caecilius Metellus Balearicus. Balearicus had two daughters of that name. The elder was a Vestal Virgin and a priestess of Juno Sospita. The younger was possibly the wife of Appius Claudius Pulcher. Kaplan says that the Caecilia Metella who sheltered Roscius was "very probably [...] also a priestess of Juno Sospita". Dyck identifies her as the wife of Pulcher. Brill's New Pauly says that she was the wife of Pulcher, but has no entry for her elder sister.) Twice more he uses it when describing his daughter, Tullia, portraying her in his letters as brave in his absence. He uses it again to describe his first wife Terentia during his exile. Virtus is attributed to Cloelia in Book 2 of Livy's Ab Urbe Condita, and also to the woman honored by the Laudatio Turiae.

=== Children ===
Virtus was not a term commonly used to describe children. Since virtus was primarily attributed to a full-grown man who had served in the military, children were not particularly suited to obtain this particular virtue.

=== Slaves ===
While a slave was able to be homo ('man') he was not considered a vir. Slaves were often referred to as puer (Latin for 'boy') to denote that they were not citizens. Since a slave could not be a vir it follows that they could not have the quality of virtus. Once a slave was manumitted, he was able to become a vir and also classified as a freedman, but this did not allow him to have virtus. A good slave or freedman was said to have fides, but no virtus.

=== Foreigners ===
Foreigners in the Roman world could be attributed with virtus, for example, if they fought bravely. Virtus could also be lost in battle. Virtus could even be a qualification for citizenship, as in the case of Spanish cavalry men granted citizenship by Gnaeus Pompeius Strabo in 89 BCE for their virtus in battle.

== Usage ==
Virtus applies exclusively to a man's behaviour in the public sphere; that is, to the application of duty to the res publica in the cursus honorum. His private business was no place to earn virtus, even when it involved courage, feats of arms, or other associated qualities performed for the public good.

=== In private ===
While in many cultures it is considered "manly" to father and provide for a family, family life was considered in the Roman world to be part of the private sphere, in which there was no place for virtus. Most uses of virtus to describe any part of private life are ambiguous and refer to another similar quality. In the Roman world the oldest living patriarch of the family was called the pater familias. This title implied that he could make all legal and binding decisions for the family; he also owned all its money, land, and other property. His wife, daughters, sons, and his sons' families were all under his potestas. The only time a son was seen as separate from his father's control in the eyes of other Romans was when he assumed his public identity as a citizen. He could earn his virtus by serving in the military, and thus he could only demonstrate manliness outside of the family setting. This is another reason that virtus is not often used to describe Roman private life.

=== In public ===
Virtus was a crucial component for a political career. Its broad definition led to it being used to describe a number of qualities that the Roman people idealized in their leaders.

In everyday life a typical Roman, especially a young boy, would have been inculcated with the idea of virtus. Since military service was a part of the lives of most Roman men, military training would have started fairly early. Young boys would have learned how to wield weapons and military tactics starting at home with their fathers and older male relatives and later in school. Also a young boy would have heard numerous stories about past heroes, battles, and wars. Some of these stories would have told of the virtus of past heroes, and even family members. Publicly it was easy to see the rewards of virtus. Public triumphs were held for victorious generals and rewards were given to brave fighters. This propaganda encouraged young boys coming into their manhood to be brave fighters and earn virtus. It was the duty of every generation of men to maintain the dignitas which his family had already earned and to enlarge it. Pressure to live up to the standards of one's ancestors was great. In achieving virtus one could also achieve gloria. By gaining virtus and gloria one could hope to aspire to high political office and great renown.

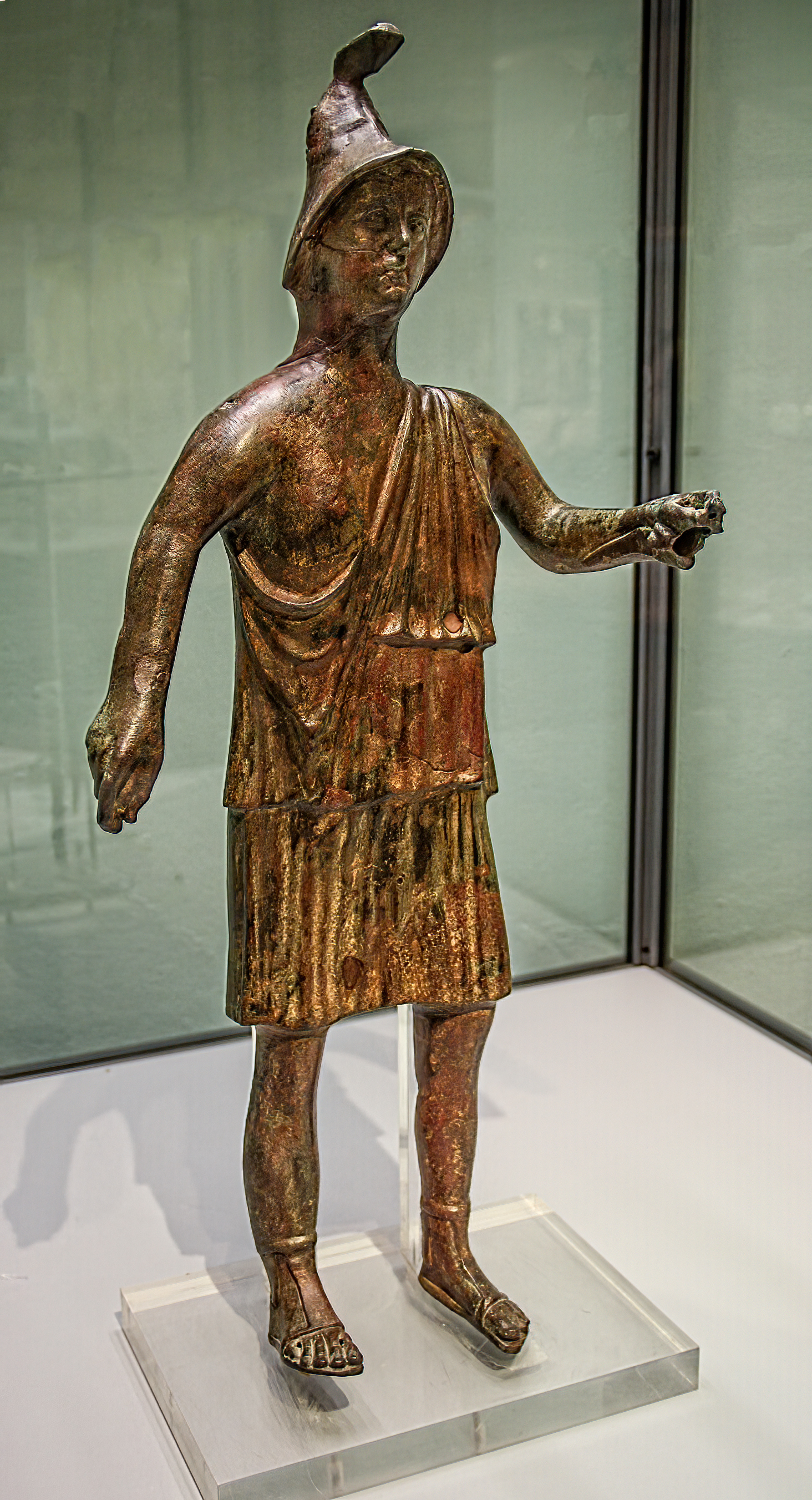
Virtus, bronze, 1–3rd century CE, at the Archaeological Museum of Milan, Italy

Cicero suggested that virtus was real manhood and that it boiled down to "Ever to excel". He declared that, "The whole glory of virtue [virtus] resides in activity." A Roman political man would only need to show scars in defense of the Republic to prove his worth.

Romans established their status through activity, creating a pecking order of honour. This involved agon—a test, trial, or ordeal requiring active effort to overcome. This activity was thought to banish certain characteristics of Roman thought that were believed to be negative. Such negative characteristics included being shameless, inactive, isolated, or leisurely and were the absence of virtus; placing dignitas into a static, frozen state. The contest established one's being and constructed the reality of one's virtus. Romans were willing to suffer shame, humiliation, victory, defeat, glory, destruction, success, and failure in pursuit of this.

Virtus was often associated with being aggressive and this could be dangerous in the public sphere and the political world. Displays of violent virtus were controlled through several methods. Men seeking to hold political office typically had to follow the cursus honorum. Many political offices had an age minimum which ensured that the men filling the positions had the proper amount of experience in the military and in government. Thus, even if a man proved himself capable of filling a position or was able to persuade people that he was capable, he would not necessarily be able to hold the position until he had reached a certain age. Minimum age also ensured an equal basis for candidates in elections for public offices, because by the time most men went into public office they would have retired from military service. Furthermore, before any Roman soldier could partake in single combat, he had to gain permission from his general. This was meant to keep soldiers from putting themselves in unnecessary danger in order to gain virtus.

Politically, virtus also tended to be a concept of morality. In contrast to its representation of manliness—as seen in aggression and the ruthless acquisition of money, land, and power—the lighter, more idealistic political meaning almost took on the extended meaning of pietas, as a man who was morally upright and concerned with the matters of the state.

Plautus in Amphitruo contrasted virtus and ambitio. Virtus is seen as a positive attribute, while though ambitio itself is not necessarily a negative attribute it is often associated with negative methods such as bribery. Plautus said that just as great generals and armies win victory by virtus, so should political candidates. Ambitio "is the wrong method of reaching a good end". Part of virtus, in the political sphere, was to deal justly in every aspect of one's life, especially in political and state matters.

According to Brett and Kate McKay, the Roman identity exists in a paradigm; Rome was a contest culture and honor culture. Romans believed "your identity was neither fixed nor permanent, your worth was a moving target, and you had to always be actively engaged in proving yourself."

=== Sexuality ===
While in many cultures the virtue of manliness is seen as being partly sexual, in the Roman world the word virtus did not necessitate sexuality. Similar words deriving from the same stem often have sexual connotations, such as the word for man itself (vir) and the concept of "virility" (virilitas). Nonetheless, poems such as Catullus 16 and the Carmina Priapea, as well as speeches such as Cicero's In Verrem, demonstrate that manliness and pudicitia, or sexual propriety, were linked.

=== Marcellus and the Temple ===
M. Claudius Marcellus, during the battle of Clastidium in 222 BCE, dedicated a temple to Honos and Virtus. This was one of the first times that Virtus had been recognized as divine. The connection with Honos would have been obvious to most Romans, as demonstrations of virtus led to election to public office, and both were considered honos. The cult of Honos was already a long-standing tradition in Rome. The marriage of the two deities ensured that Virtus would also get proper respect from the Romans. But the pontiffs objected that one temple could not properly house two gods because there would be no way of knowing to which god to sacrifice should a miracle happen in the temple.

=== Augustus ===
During the reign of Augustus, the Senate voted that a golden shield be inscribed with Augustus' attributes and displayed in the Curia Iulia, these virtues including virtus, clementia, iustitia, and pietas. These political catchwords continued to be used as propaganda by later emperors.

=== In literature ===
The comic poet Plautus made use of virtus in his play Trinummus, which concerned family virtus, honor, public office, and obligations to the state. He also offered commentary on the concept of virtus in Amphitruo (see § In public above).

Cicero said, "[only] virtus usually wards off a cruel and dishonorable death, and virtus is the badge of the Roman race and breed. Cling fast to [virtus], I beg you men of Rome, as a heritage that your ancestors bequeathed to you. All else is false and doubtful, ephemeral and changeful: only virtus stands firmly fixed, its roots run deep, it can never be shaken by any violence, never moved from its place."

== See also ==
Media related to Virtus at Wikimedia Commons

- Virtue § Roman virtues – contains a list of Roman virtues
- Arete
- Auctoritas
- Justice
- Clementia
- Courage
- Gravitas
- Pietas
- Prudence
- Virya

== Bibliography ==
- Cicero (1930). Pro Quinctio. Pro Roscio Amerino. Pro Roscio Comoedo. On the Agrarian Law. Loeb Classical Library. Vol. 240. Translated by J. H. Freese. Cambridge, MA: Harvard University Press.
- Barton, Carlin A. (2001). Roman Honor: The Fire in the Bones. Berkeley, CA: University of California Press. ISBN 978-0520225251.
- Cicero (2010). Dyck, Andrew R. (ed.). Cicero: 'Pro Sexto Roscio'. Cambridge University Press. ISBN 978-0521882248.
- Earl, Donald (1966). The Political Thought Of Sallust. Amsterdam: Hakkert.
- Earl, Donald (1967). The Moral and Political Traditions of Rome. Ithaca, NY: Cornell University Press.
- McDonnell, Myles (2006). Roman Manliness: Virtus and the Roman Republic. Cambridge University Press. ISBN 978-0-521-11893-4.
- Richlin, Amy (2006). "Sexuality in the Roman Empire". In Powell, David (ed.). A Companion to the Roman Empire. Blackwell. pp. 327–353.
- Young, Elizabeth (2015). "The Touch of the Cinnaedus: Unmanly Sensations in the Carmina Priapea". Classical Antiquity. 34 (1): 183–208. doi:10.1525/CA.2015.34.1.183.
