= Cult (religious practice) =

Devotion to a deity, person or thing

Cult is the care (Latin: cultus) owed to deities or saints and their temples, shrines, or churches; cult is embodied in ritual and ceremony. Its presence or former presence is made concrete in temples, shrines and churches, and cult images, including votive offerings at votive sites.

== Etymology ==
Cicero defined religio as cultus deorum, "the cultivation of the gods". The "cultivation" necessary to maintain a specific deity was that god's cultus, "cult", and required "the knowledge of giving the gods their due" (scientia colendorum deorum). The noun cultus originates from the past participle of the verb colo, colere, colui, cultus, "to tend, take care of, cultivate", originally meaning "to dwell in, inhabit" and thus "to tend, cultivate land (ager); to practice agriculture", an activity fundamental to Roman identity even when Rome as a political center had become fully urbanized.

Cultus is often translated as "cult" without the negative connotations the word may have in English, or with the Old English word "worship", but it implies the necessity of active maintenance beyond passive adoration. Cultus was expected to matter to the gods as a demonstration of respect, honor, and reverence; it was an aspect of the contractual nature of Roman religion (see do ut des). Augustine of Hippo echoes Cicero's formulation when he declares, "religion is nothing other than the cultus of God."

The term "cult" first appeared in English in 1617, derived from the French culte, meaning "worship" which in turn originated from the Latin word cultus meaning "care, cultivation, worship". The meaning "devotion to a person or thing" is from 1829. Starting about 1920, "cult" acquired an additional six or more positive and negative definitions. In French, for example, sections in newspapers giving the schedule of worship for Catholic services are headed Culte Catholique, while the section giving the schedule of Protestant services is headed culte réformé.

== Outward religious practice ==
In the specific context of the Greek hero cult, Carla Antonaccio wrote:

The term cult identifies a pattern of ritual behavior in connection with specific objects, within a framework of spatial and temporal coordinates. Rituals would include (but not necessarily be limited to) prayer, sacrifice, votive offerings, competitions, processions and construction of monuments. Some degree of recurrence in place and repetition over time of ritual action is necessary for a cult to be enacted, to be practiced.

In the Catholic Church, outward religious practice in cultus is the technical term for Roman Catholic devotions or veneration extended to a particular saint, not to the worship of God. Catholicism and the Eastern Orthodox Church make a major distinction between latria, the worship that is offered to God alone, and dulia, which is veneration offered to the saints, including the veneration of Mary, whose veneration is often referred to as hyperdulia.

== See also ==
- History of religion
- Mythology
- Place of worship
- Religious fanaticism
