= Carnarvon Terms =

The Carnarvon Terms were a set of proposals ordered by the British colonial secretary Lord Carnarvon in 1874 to settle the dispute between British Columbia and Canada over the construction of the transcontinental railroad and the Vancouver Island railroad and train bridge. Vancouver Island and British Columbia had been promised a rail link as a precondition of their entry into confederation in 1871.

== History ==
In 1874, British Columbia threatened to withdraw from Confederation. Queen Victoria was petitioned by Premier Walkem for relief from failure to delivery the promise of a railroad to Victoria. Prime Minister Alexander Mackenzie and Walkem agreed to accept arbitration of the dispute by the Earl of Carnarvon, the Colonial Secretary. Both parties promised to be bound by the ruling. The judgment was given on 17 November 1874.

A report of the Privy Council accepting the new terms was approved by the Governor General on December 18, 1874. Nevertheless, the federal government bill approving the settlement agreement failed in the Senate of Canada, and British Columbia secession was raised again.

== Decision ==
Earl of Carnarvon terms:

1. "That the railway from Esquimalt to Nanaimo shall be commenced as soon as possible, and completed with all practicable despatch."

2. "That the surveys on the Mainland shall be pushed on with the utmost vigor. On this point, after considering the representations of your, ministers, I feel that I have no alternative but to reply, as I do most fully and readily, upon their assurance that no legitimate effort or expense will be spared, first, to determine the best route for the line, and secondly, to proceed with the details of the engineering work. It would be distasteful to me, if, indeed, it were not impossible, to prescribe strictly any minimum of time or expenditure with regard to work of so uncertain a nature; but, happily, it is equally impossible for me to doubt that your Government will loyally do its best in every way to accelerate the completion of a duty left freely to its sense of honor and justice."

3. "That the wagon road and telegraph line shall be immediately constructed. There seems here to be some difference of opinion as to the special value to the Province of the undertaking to complete these two works, but after considering what has been said, I am of opinion that they should both be proceeded with at once, as indeed is suggested by your ministers."

4. "That $2,000,000 a year, and not $1,500,000, shall be the minimum expenditure on railway works within the Province from the date at which the surveys are sufficiently completed to enable that amount to be expended on construction. In naming this amount I understand that it being alike the interest and the wish of the Dominion Government to urge on with all speed the completion of the works now to be undertaken, the annual expenditure will be as much in excess of the minimum, of $2,000,000 as in any year may be found practicable."

5. "Lastly, that on or before December 31st, 1898, the railway shall be completed and open for traffic from the Pacific seaboard to a point at the western end of Lake Superior, at which it will fall into connection with the existing lines of railway through a portion of the United States, and also with the navigation of Canadian waters. To proceed at present with the remainder of the railway extending, by the country northward of Lake Superior, to the existing Canadian lines, ought not, in my opinion, to be required, and the time for undertaking that work must be determined by the development of settlement and the changing circumstances of the country. The day is, however, I hope, not very distant when a continuous line of railway through Canadian territory will be practicable, and I therefore look upon this portion of the scheme as postponed rather than abandoned."
