= Auctoritas =

Roman prestige; contrast with power, imperium

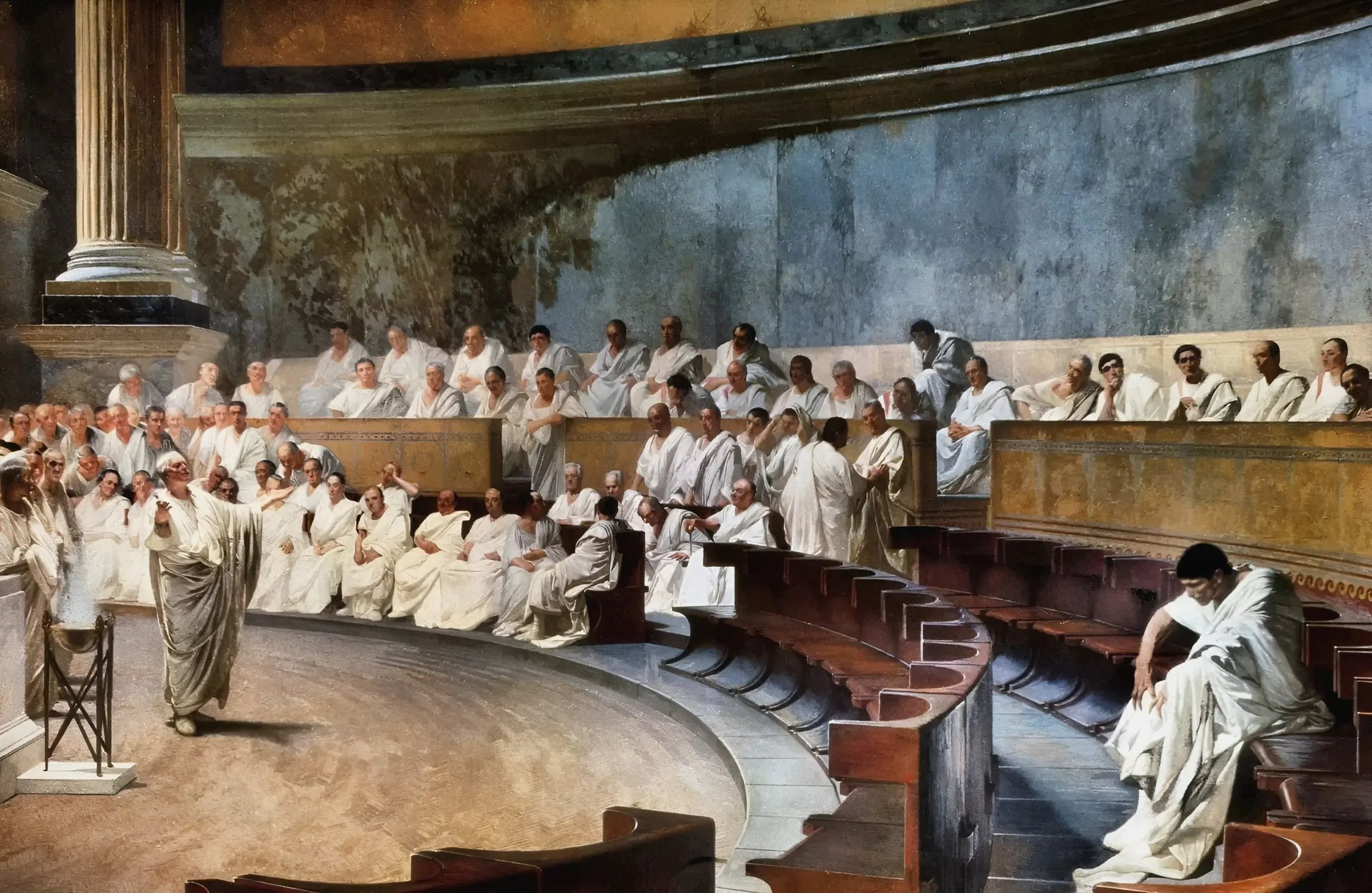
Representation of a sitting of the Roman Senate: Cicero attacks Catiline, from a 19th-century fresco

Auctoritas is a Latin word that is the origin of the English word "authority". While historically its use in English was restricted to discussions of the political history of Rome, the beginning of phenomenological philosophy in the 20th century expanded the use of the word.

In ancient Rome, auctoritas referred to the level of prestige a person had in Roman society, and, as a consequence, his standing, influence, and ability to rally support around his will. Auctoritas was not merely political, however; it had a numinous content and symbolized the mysterious "power of command" of heroic Roman figures.

Noble women could also achieve a degree of auctoritas. For example, the wives, sisters, and mothers of the Julio-Claudians had immense influence on society, the masses, and the political apparatus. Their auctoritas was exercised less overtly than that of their male counterparts due to Roman societal norms, but they were powerful nonetheless.

== Etymology and origin ==
According to linguist Émile Benveniste, auctor (which also gives us English "author") is derived from Latin augeō ("to augment", "to enlarge", "to enrich"). The auctor is "is qui auget", the one who augments the act or the juridical situation of another. Arguably, Benveniste defended that Latin "auctoritas" was based on a divine conception of power and not on the individual that happened to the position of authority.

Auctor in the sense of "author", comes from auctor as founder or, one might say, "planter-cultivator". Similarly, auctoritas refers to rightful ownership, based on one's having "produced" or homesteaded the article of property in question – more in the sense of "sponsored" or "acquired" than "manufactured". This auctoritas would, for example, persist through an usucapio of ill-gotten or abandoned property.

== Political meaning in ancient Rome ==
Politically, the Roman Senate's authority (auctoritas patrum) was connected to auctoritas—not to be confused with potestas or imperium, which were held by the magistrates or the people. In this context, auctoritas could be defined as the juridical power to authorize some other act.

The 19th-century classicist Theodor Mommsen describes the "force" of auctoritas as "more than advice and less than command, an advice which one may not ignore." Cicero says of power and authority, "Cum potestas in populo auctoritas in senatu sit." ("While power resides in the people, authority rests with the Senate.")

In the private domain, those under tutelage (guardianship), such as women and minors, were similarly obliged to seek the sanction of their tutors ("protectors") for certain actions. Thus, auctoritas characterizes the auctor: The pater familias authorizes—that is, validates and legitimates—his son's wedding in prostate. In this way, auctoritas might function as a kind of "passive counsel", much as, for example, a scholarly authority.

In traditional imperial Rome, exceptions could be made to override legal concepts and rules of law under specific military and political situations. This authority allowed the imperial power to safeguard the state and its citizens. In cases where it was necessary to protect the state, a dictator could be appointed by the senate to temporarily override the fundamental laws and rules of the Roman Constitution.

=== Auctoritas principis ===
After the fall of the Republic, during the days of the Roman Empire, the Emperor had the title of princeps ("first citizen" of Rome) and held the auctoritas principis—the supreme moral authority—in conjunction with the imperium and potestas—the military, judicial, and administrative powers. That is to say, there is a non-committal to a separation of powers, some civil rights, constitutionalism, codified constitutional state and legalist concept of law.

== Middle Ages ==
The notion of auctoritas was often invoked by the papacy during the Middle Ages, in order to secure the temporal power of the Pope. Innocent III most famously invoked auctoritas in order to depose kings and emperors and to try to establish a papal theocracy.

== Early modernity ==
In his Leviathan, Thomas Hobbes coined the expression: "Auctoritas, not veritas, fecit legem." ("Authority, not truth, makes laws.") This dictum would later become a favorite of the German jurist Carl Schmitt in his decisionistic defense of the Nazi government.

== Hannah Arendt ==
Hannah Arendt considered auctoritas a reference to founding acts as the source of political authority in ancient Rome. She took foundation to include (as augeō suggests), the continuous conservation and increase of principles handed down from "the beginning" (see also pietas). According to Arendt, this source of authority was rediscovered in the course of the 18th-century American Revolution (see "United States of America" under Founding Fathers), as an alternative to an intervening Western tradition of absolutism, claiming absolute authority, as from God (see Divine Right of Kings), and later from Nature, Reason, History, and even, as in the French Revolution, Revolution itself (see La Terreur). Arendt views a crisis of authority as common to both the American and French Revolutions, and the response to that crisis a key factor in the relative success of the former and failure of the latter.

Arendt further considered the sense of auctor and auctoritas in various Latin idioms, and the fact that auctor was used in contradistinction to – and (at least by Pliny) held in higher esteem than – artifices, the artisans to whom it might fall to "merely" build up or implement the author-founder's vision and design.

== See also ==
- Authoritarianism – Political system
- Authority – Legitimate power to decide or authorize
- Athenian law – Laws and legal institutions of Ancient Greece
- Constitution of the Roman Republic
- Discipline – Self-control
- Hierarchy – System of elements that are subordinated to each other
- Mund (law) – Germanic legal relationship
- Nobility – Official privileged social class
- Piety – Religious devotion or spirituality
- Potestas – Latin word meaning power or faculty
- Roman law – Law in Ancient Rome (c. 449 BC – AD 529)
- Virtues in ancient Rome
  - Gravitas – Ancient Roman virtue
  - Pietas – Ancient Roman virtue
  - Dignitas – Ancient Roman virtue
  - Virtus – Masculine virtue in Ancient Rome
