= Pietas =

Ancient Roman virtue

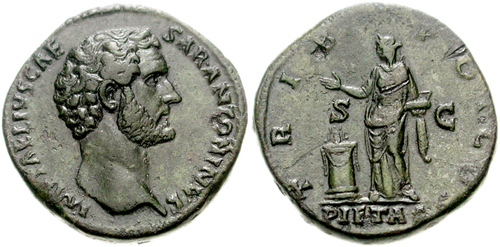
Pietas, as a virtue of the emperor Antoninus Pius, represented by a woman offering a sacrifice on the reverse of this sestertius

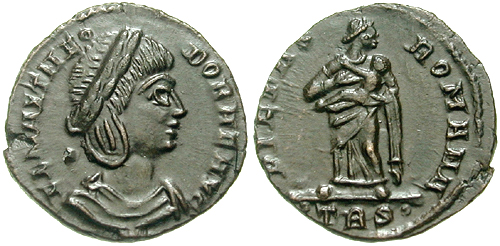
Flavia Maximiana Theodora on the obverse, on the reverse Pietas holding infant to her breast.

Pietas (Classical Latin: [ˈpiɛtaːs]), translated variously as "duty", "religiosity" or "religious behavior", "loyalty", "devotion", or "filial piety" (English "piety" derives from the Latin), was one of the chief virtues among the ancient Romans. It was the distinguishing virtue of the founding hero Aeneas, who is often given the adjectival epithet pius ("religious, devoted") throughout Virgil's epic Aeneid. The sacred nature of pietas was embodied by the divine personification Pietas, a goddess often pictured on Roman coins. The Greek equivalent is eusebeia (εὐσέβεια).

Cicero defined pietas as the virtue "which admonishes us to do our duty to our country or our parents or other blood relations." The man who possessed pietas "performed all his duties towards the deity and his fellow human beings fully and in every respect," as the 19th-century classical scholar Georg Wissowa described it. Cicero suggests people should have awareness of their own honor and must always attempt to raise the honor of others with dignified praise. Furthermore, praise, admiration, and honored actions must be beyond all one's own desires, and actions and words must be chosen with respect to friends, colleagues, family, or blood relations. Cicero describes youth in the pursuit of honour: “How they yearn for praise! What labours will they not undertake to stand fast among their peers! How will they remember those who have shown them kindness and how eager to repay it!”

The first recorded use of pietas in English occurs in Anselm Bayly's The Alliance of Music, Poetry, and Oratory, published in 1789.

== As virtue ==
Pietas erga parentes ("pietas toward one's parents") was one of the most important aspects of demonstrating virtue. Pius as a cognomen originated as way to mark a person as especially "pious" in this sense: announcing one's personal pietas through official nomenclature seems to have been an innovation of the late Republic, when Quintus Caecilius Metellus Pius claimed it for his efforts to have his father, Numidicus, recalled from exile. Pietas extended also toward "parents" in the sense of "ancestors," and was one of the basic principles of Roman tradition, as expressed by the care of the dead.

Pietas as a virtue resided within a person, in contrast to a virtue or gift such as Victoria, which was given by the gods. Pietas, however, allowed a person to recognize the divine source of benefits conferred.

A Roman with the virtue of pietas did not leave his religious duties at the door of the temple, but carried them with him everywhere, following the will of the gods in his business transactions and everyday life.

— Max Pfingsten

Pietas held great importance in the realm of international relations and diplomacy. The credibility of a commander relied heavily on their willingness to set aside personal gain and fully dedicate themselves to a cause, refraining from any treacherous actions. This emphasis on credibility led to the reputation of individual commanders and the Roman state itself playing a pragmatic role in negotiations and discussions. Commanders' commitment to fides needed to be consistent, demonstrating credibility through ongoing actions and a steady approach in dealings with neighboring entities. Upholding respect for existing contracts meant honoring pledges and oaths, thus reinforcing Rome's commitment to ethical behavior and the continuation of diplomatic strategies. The chances of resolving conflicts were minimal if deceit became the standard in negotiations by commanders.

== Iconography ==
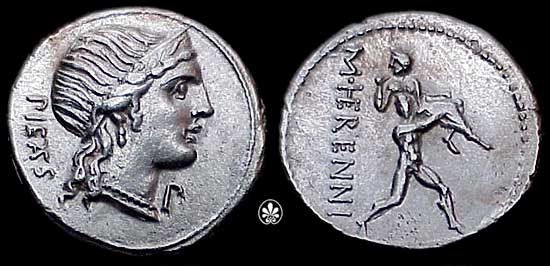
Denarius of Herennius, depicting Pietas and an act of Pietas.

Pietas was represented on coin by cult objects, but also as a woman conducting a sacrifice by means of fire at an altar. In the imagery of sacrifice, libation was the fundamental act that came to symbolize pietas.

Pietas is first represented on Roman coins on denarii issued by Marcus Herennius in 108 or 107 BCE. Pietas appears on the obverse as a divine personification, in bust form; the quality of pietas is represented by a son carrying his father on his back; the symbolism of which would be echoed in Virgil's Aeneid, with Aeneas carrying his father Anchises out of the burning Troy. Pietas is among the virtues that appear frequently on Imperial coins, including those issued under Hadrian.

One of the symbols of pietas was the stork, described by Petronius as pietaticultrix, "cultivator of pietas." The stork represented filial piety in particular, as the Romans believed that it demonstrated family loyalty by returning to the same nest every year, and that it took care of its parents in old age. As such, a stork appears next to Pietas on a coin issued by Metellus Pius (on whose cognomen see above).

== As goddess ==
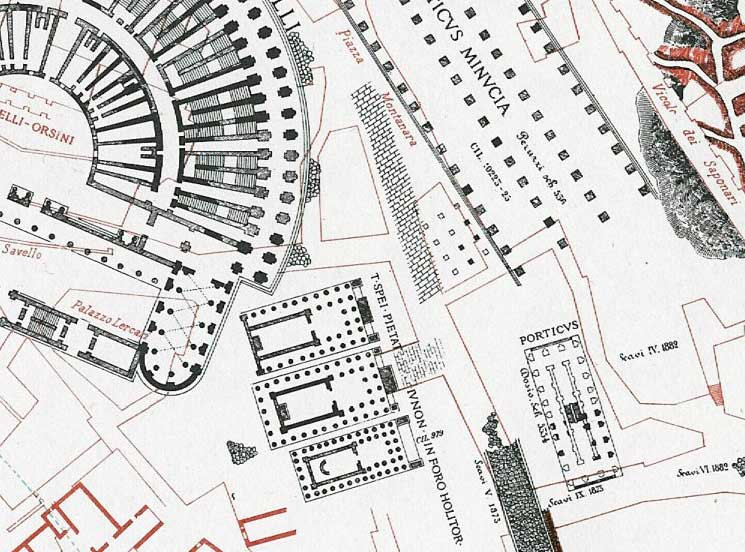
The Temple of Piety with those of Hope and Juno Sospita at the Forum Olitorium, drawn by Lanciani

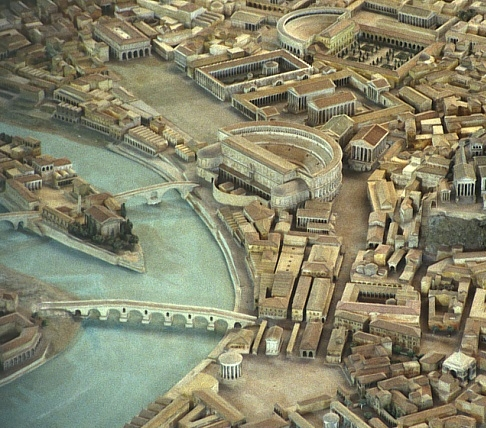
The area of the Forum Olitorium and Theater of Marcellus in the scale model of ancient Rome at the Museum of Roman Civilization

Pietas was the divine presence in everyday life that cautioned humans not to intrude on the realm of the gods. Violations of pietas required a piaculum, expiatory rites.

The Temple of Piety at Rome was solemnly vowed by the plebeian consul and new man Manius Acilius Glabrio at the Battle of Thermopylae in 191 BCE, where he defeated the emperor Antiochus the Great during the Roman–Seleucid War. Completed by his son, it was erected at the northwest end of the Roman vegetable market (Forum Olitorium) near the Carmental Gate. It included a gold statue of the father, the first such statue of a Roman citizen in the city.

According to a miraculous legend (miraculum), a poor woman who was starving in prison was saved when her daughter gave her breast milk (compare Roman Charity). Caught in the act, the daughter was not punished, but recognized for her pietas. Mother and daughter were set free, and given public support for the rest of their lives. The site was regarded as sacred to the goddess Pietas (consecratus deae) because she had chosen to manifest her presence there. The story exemplified pietas erga parentes, the proper devotion one ought to show to one's parents.

=== Imperial women portrayed as Pietas ===
Pietas was often depicted as goddess on the reverse of Roman Imperial coins, with women of the imperial family on the obverse, as an appropriate virtue to be attributed to them. Women of the Imperial family might be portrayed in art in the goddess's guise.

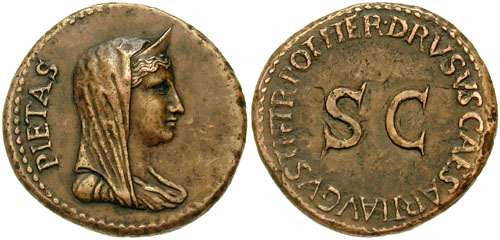
Livia as Pietas

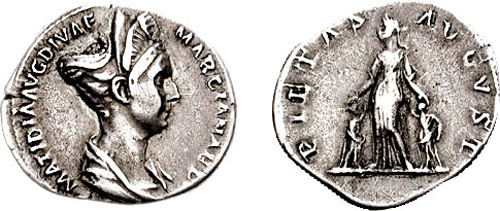
Salonia Matidia

== See also ==
- Eusebeia ("Proper Reverence"), the Ancient Greek concept most similar to Latin pietas
- Hope (Spes), Luck (Fortuna), and Faithfulness (Fides), other concepts worshipped as Roman goddesses
- Virtue/manliness (virtus), dignity (dignitas), solemnity (gravitas), and modesty (pudicitia), as Roman concepts
- Mos maiorum
- Pietism – Movement within Lutheranism
- "Roman Charity", Valerius Maximus's account of a Roman woman embodying pietas by breastfeeding her incarcerated father to save him from enforced starvation, much depicted in early modern European painting
- Pietas Comunità Gentile, a neopagan Roman-Italic association
