= Gravitas =

Ancient Roman virtue

Gravitas (Classical Latin: [ˈɡrawɪt̪aːs̠]) was one of the ancient Roman virtues that denoted seriousness. It is also translated variously as weight, dignity, or importance, and connotes self-discipline and moral rigor. It also conveys a sense of responsibility and commitment to the task.

Along with pietas (regard for discipline and authority), severitas, gloria, simplicitas (lucidity), integritas, dignitas, and virtus, gravitas was particularly appreciated as an ideal characteristic in leaders. Gravitas and virtus are considered more canonical virtues than the others.

== Roman concept ==
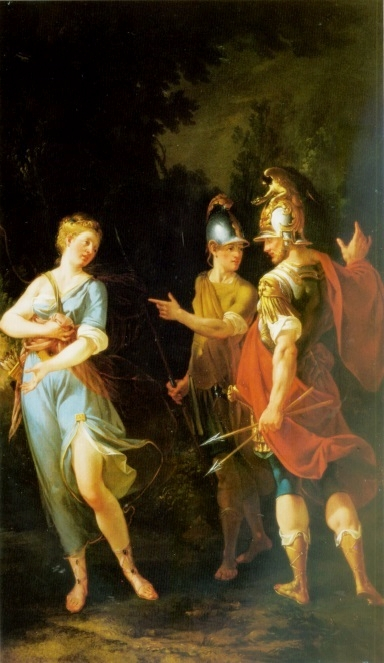
Aeneas, depicted here with Venus, was considered the embodiment of gravitas, pietas, dignitas, and virtus.

Gravitas was one of the virtues that allowed citizens, particularly statesmen, to embody the concept of romanitas, which denotes what it meant to be Roman and how Romans regarded themselves, eventually evolving into a national character. Many Roman philosophers praised constantia (perseverance, endurance, and courage), dignitas, and gravitas as the most important virtues; this is because they made dignified men capable. They accompany Roman actions. The men of the ruling upper and upper-middle classes were educated in a public school system where Classical language and literature formed basic elements of the curriculum.

Exuding gravitas or dignified and serious conduct allowed Romans to maintain a persistent element of conservatism and traditionalism. According to the Roman emperor and philosopher Marcus Aurelius, the cultivation of gravitas involves acting with sincerity and dignity, by being temperate in manner and speech as well as by carrying oneself with authority.

Other sources associate gravitas with living an austere lifestyle. It was one of the moral bases of the sanctioned control exercised by the Roman censores (see Roman Censors). An account described how old statesmen who realized that they no longer meet the standards of romanitas for failing to perform their public function with dignity and gravitas committed suicide or simply refused taking food. This concerned how the Romans defined themselves and their honor.

During Augustus' regime, gravitas was not included in the four cardinal virtues (virtus, clementia, justitia, and pietas) that were introduced to establish the myth of the Roman emperor and the model of a good ruler.

== Greek presence ==
Aristotle identified three essentials of persuasive communication—a component of personal presence:

1. Logical argument (the ability to articulate your points clearly)
2. Emotion (the ability to create or control emotion in your listeners)
3. Character (the ability to convey integrity and goodwill)

== Modern concepts ==
In the British education system, gravitas was seen as one of the pillars of the moral formation of the English gentleman during the Victorian and Edwardian eras. This partly derived from the notion of aristocratic pedigree, indicating polish, grace in manner, and dignity in outward appearance. The British Empire also derived from the moral concept of imperium such that gravitas and other Roman virtues were idealized in its imperial society and in the governance of its dominion. India, for instance, was ruled by men whose senses of power were imbued with Roman virtues. The concept of imperium also dominated the colonial Civil Service. The United Kingdom House of Commons also uses the term "bottom", which is the Conservative code for gravitas.

Gravitas is also used in communication, particularly in speech, where it denotes the use of emphasis in order to give certain words weight. Self-monitoring questions can determine expressive behavior and affective display, which could translate to gravitas in the way one conducts oneself or speaks. Self-monitoring questions can include: am I staying neutral, hindering direction, or am I helping to contribute with my participation?

== See also ==
- Auctoritas – Roman prestige; contrast with power, imperium
- Good faith – Intention to be fair, open, and honest – also known as bona fides in Latin
- Potestas – Latin word meaning power or faculty
- Precommitment – Concept in behavioral economics
- Xenia (Greek) – Ancient Greek concept of hospitality
