= Dignitas (Roman concept) =

Ancient Roman virtue

Dignitas (Classical Latin: [ˈdɪŋnɪtaːs]) is a Latin word referring to a unique, intangible, and culturally subjective social concept in the ancient Roman mindset. The word does not have a direct translation in English. Some interpretations include "dignity", which is a derivation from "dignitas", and "prestige", "charisma" and "power from personal respect".

Dignitas was the influence a male citizen acquired throughout his life, including personal reputation, moral standing, and ethical worth, along with the man's entitlement to respect and proper treatment owing to the reputation and standing of his family.

The Oxford Latin Dictionary defines the expression as fitness, suitability, worthiness, visual impressiveness or distinction, dignity of style and gesture, rank, status, position, standing, esteem, importance, and honour.

== Origins ==
Authors who had used dignitas extensively in their writings and oratories include Cicero, Julius Caesar, Tacitus, and Livy. The most prolific user was Cicero, who initially related it to the established term auctoritas (authority). These two words were highly associated, with the latter defined as the expression of a man's dignitas.

== Personal significance ==
The cultivation of dignitas in ancient Rome was extremely personal. Men of all classes, most particularly noblemen of consular families, were highly protective and zealous of this asset. This is because every man who took on a higher political office during the Roman Republic considered dignitas as comprising much more than just his dignity. It referred to his "good name" (his past and present reputation, achievement, standing, and honour). Its importance within the hierarchical classes of Roman society meant many historical figures would kill, commit suicide (e.g., Mark Antony), or enter exile in order to preserve their dignitas.

== Influence on conflict ==
The personal significance of one's dignitas had encouraged several conflicts in ancient Rome. Florus claimed that the stubbornness of Cato the Younger had driven Pompeius Magnus to prepare defences in order to build up his dignitas. Cicero wrote that Caesar valued his status so greatly that he did not want anyone to be his equal in dignitas. Aulus Hirtius had written that Marcus Claudius Marcellus, who was one of the instigators of Caesar's recall from Gaul, had attempted to build all of his own reputation on his success on turning people's feelings against Caesar. Whether the exact term was used much during these times is unknown; however, the concept of dignitas was certainly influential and considered worth fighting for by romans.

== Changing definition ==
Over the course of ancient Roman history, dignitas had never taken on all of the aforementioned descriptions simultaneously. The term took on different meanings over time, adjusting for the gradually changing viewpoints of society, politicians, and the various authors.

Years after Caesar's death, his heir Augustus rejected the contemporary meaning of dignitas. Augustus found the related term auctoritas to be a suitable alternative.

In 46 BC, Cicero cited the ambiguous nature of the concept of dignitas. He wrote, "And so I have, if loyal feeling for the state and winning good men's approval of those loyal feelings is all that dignitas amounts to; but if in dignitas you include the power of translating those loyal feelings into action or of defending them with complete freedom, then ne vestigium quidem ullum est reliquum nobis dignitatis [not even a trace is left to us of our dignity]."

== Combination of dignitas and otium ==
When paired with the term otium, the word dignitas took on a different meaning. Cicero did not consider himself worthy of having dignitas alone because he felt that—by turning his back on the Roman public—he had neglected the duty of one whose life had normally exemplified the concept. He then altered the definition to mean "[lifetime] impact", to better describe his unique status. By this time, Cicero's political life had ended, and he labelled his past political influence as his dignitas, and his present standing as otium.

== See also ==
- Face (sociological concept) – Class of behaviors and customs
- Pietas – Ancient Roman virtue
- Gravitas – Ancient Roman virtue
- Mos maiorum – Customs and traditions of ancient Rome
- Historiography of the fall of the Western Roman Empire

== Bibliography ==
- Balsdon, J.p.v.d. "Auctoritas, Dignitas, Otium." The Classical Quarterly ns 10 (1960): 43–50.
- Barschel, Henriette. Dignitas – Genese eines römischen Wertbegriffs. Eeine begriffsgeschichtliche Untersuchung [Dignitas - Genesis of a Roman concept of value. An investigation into the history of concepts]. Wiesbaden: Reichert, 2016, ISBN 978-3-95490-142-5.
- Radin, Max. "Roman Concepts of Equality." Political Science Quarterly 38 (1923): 262–289.
- Remy Debes (ed.), Dignity: a History, New York: Oxford University Press, 2017.
- Ridler, Vivian. "Dignitas." In: Oxford Latin Dictionary. Volume 1. London: Oxford UP, 1968.
