= Caecilia Metella =

Caecilia Metella may refer to:

- Caecilia Metella (daughter of Balearicus)
- Caecilia Metella (daughter of Celer)
- Caecilia Metella (daughter of Delmaticus), fourth wife of dictator Sulla
- Tomb of Caecilia Metella, on the Appian Way in Rome

== See also ==
- Caecilii Metelli
