= Gezelligheid =

Dutch social/situational notion evocative of conviviality, coziness, fun

Gezelligheid (Dutch pronunciation: [ɣəˈzɛləxɛit]) is a culturally Dutch concept that describes a general and abstract sensation of individual well-being that one typically shares with others, a positive atmosphere, flow or vibe that colours the individual personal experience in a favourable way and in one way or another corresponds to social contexts. As a vague, abstract notion, gezelligheid has been described as a word that is difficult to translate to English, as a unique emotion, and even as the heart of Dutch culture.

== Etymology ==
The word derives from gezel which means 'companion' or 'friend'. During the Middle Ages a gezel was also the Dutch term for a 'journeyman', which in the Dutch guild system formed a group around a single master craftsman; hence the added meaning of 'belonging'.

== Use ==
Gezellig can be used in places or with a party of people (one or more) that are 'easy to relax into' and 'heartening'.

The adjective gezellig can be used in a wide variety of situations:

- A room, restaurant, or café can be gezellig (meaning 'cozy' or 'inviting').
- A person can be gezellig (meaning 'inviting' or 'pleasant' or 'funny', 'convivial' or 'sociable').
- A party can be gezellig (meaning 'relaxed atmosphere with nice people and cozy surroundings').
- A visit to one's grandparents can be gezellig (meaning 'togetherness').

Gezellig can also be used as an exclamation, which can either carry the meanings described above or be used sarcastically or ironically or to express enthusiasm for an upcoming event such as one of the above.

The antonym to gezellig is ongezellig, which is used to describe places and situations that are uninviting, lacking in warmth or atmosphere, a person who is cold, distant, unsociable, unwilling to engage in a social situation.

== See also ==
- Gemütlichkeit
- Hygge
- Lagom
- Simple living
- Slow movement
