= Gemütlichkeit =

Pleasant emotional state

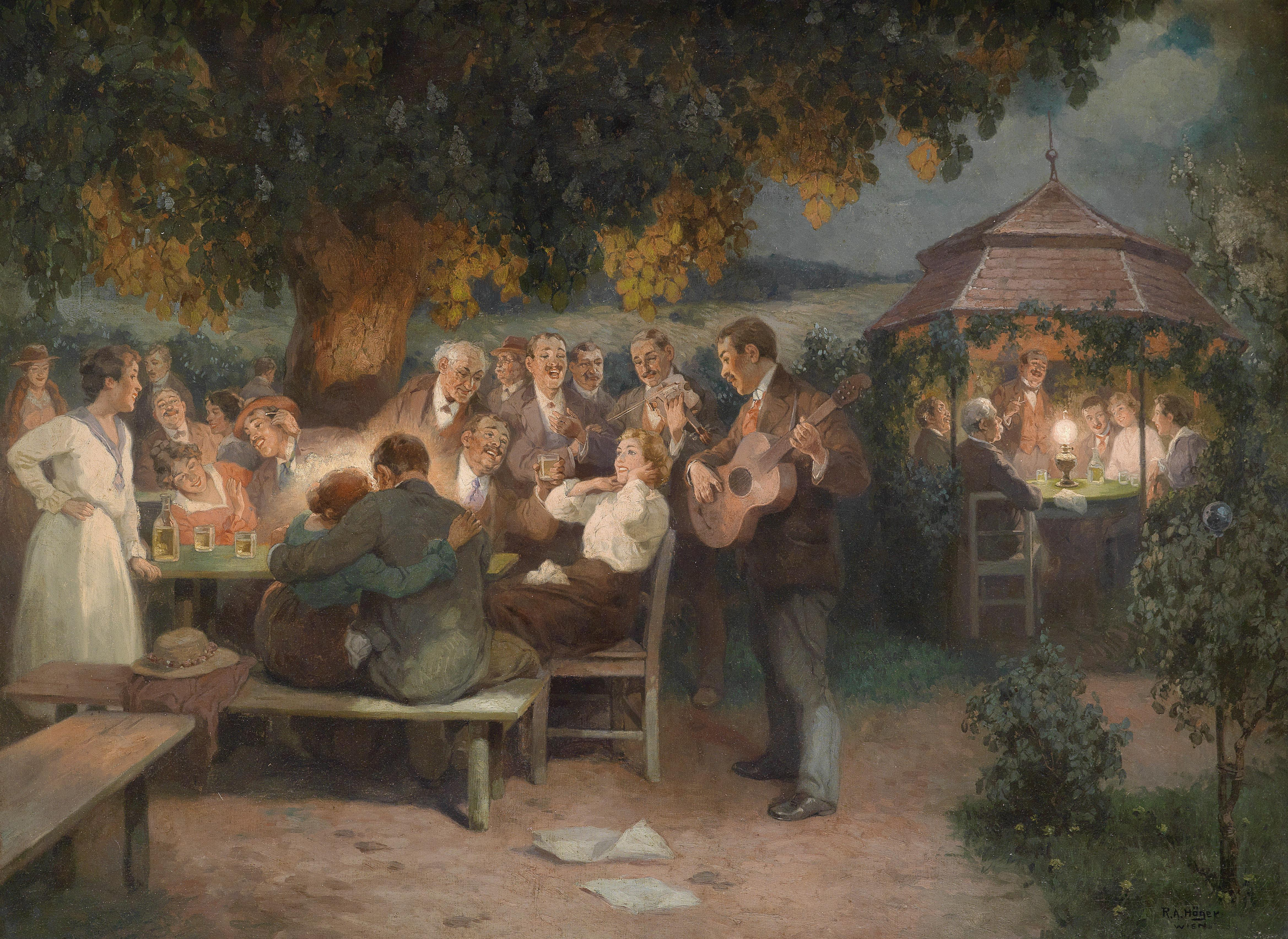
Beim Heurigen in Grinzing is a typical scene of Gemütlichkeit, painting by Rudolf Alfred Höger (1900).

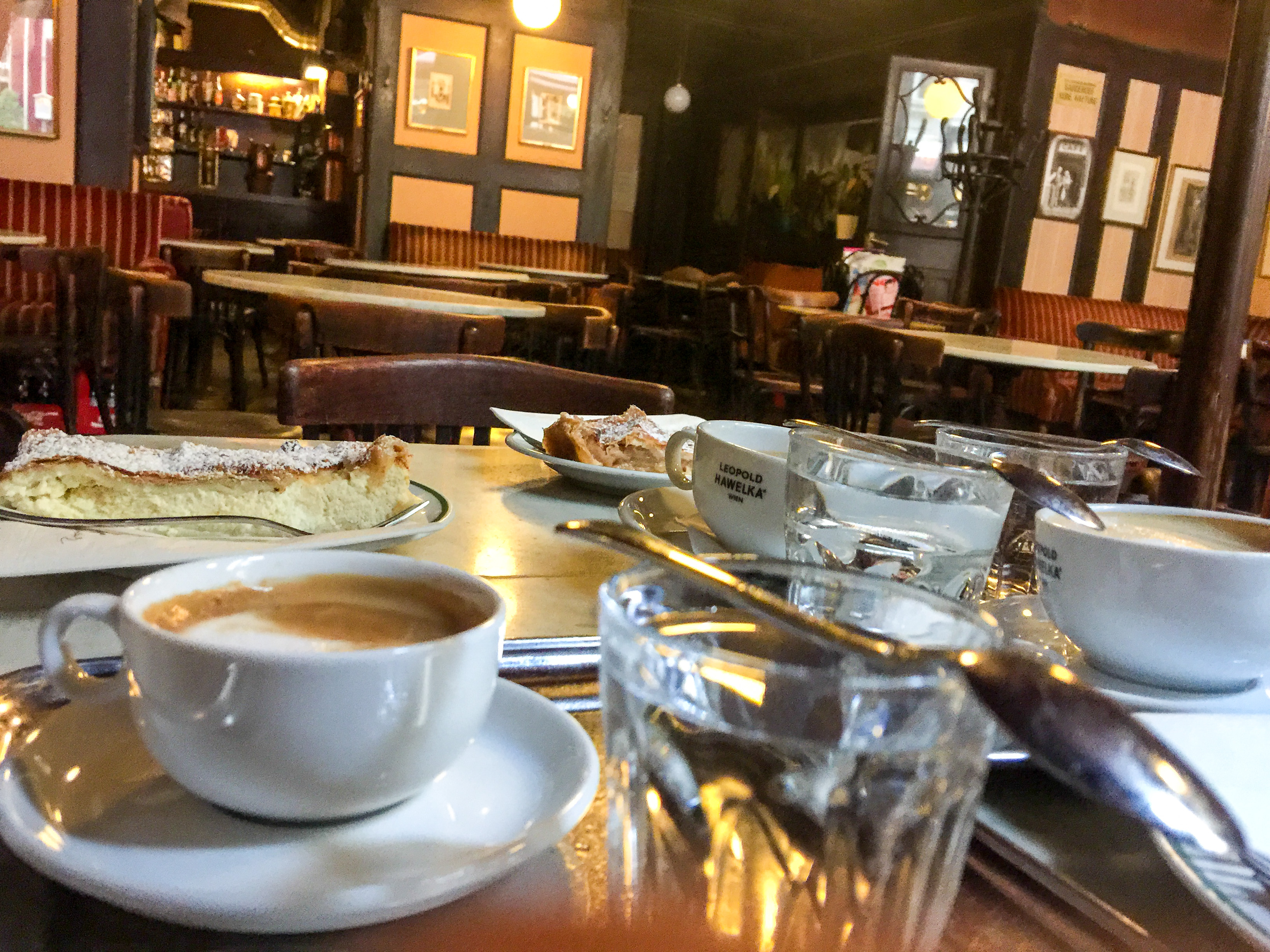
Interior of the Café Hawelka with plush furniture and muted colours, serving cake and coffee, is a typical example of Gemütlichkeit.

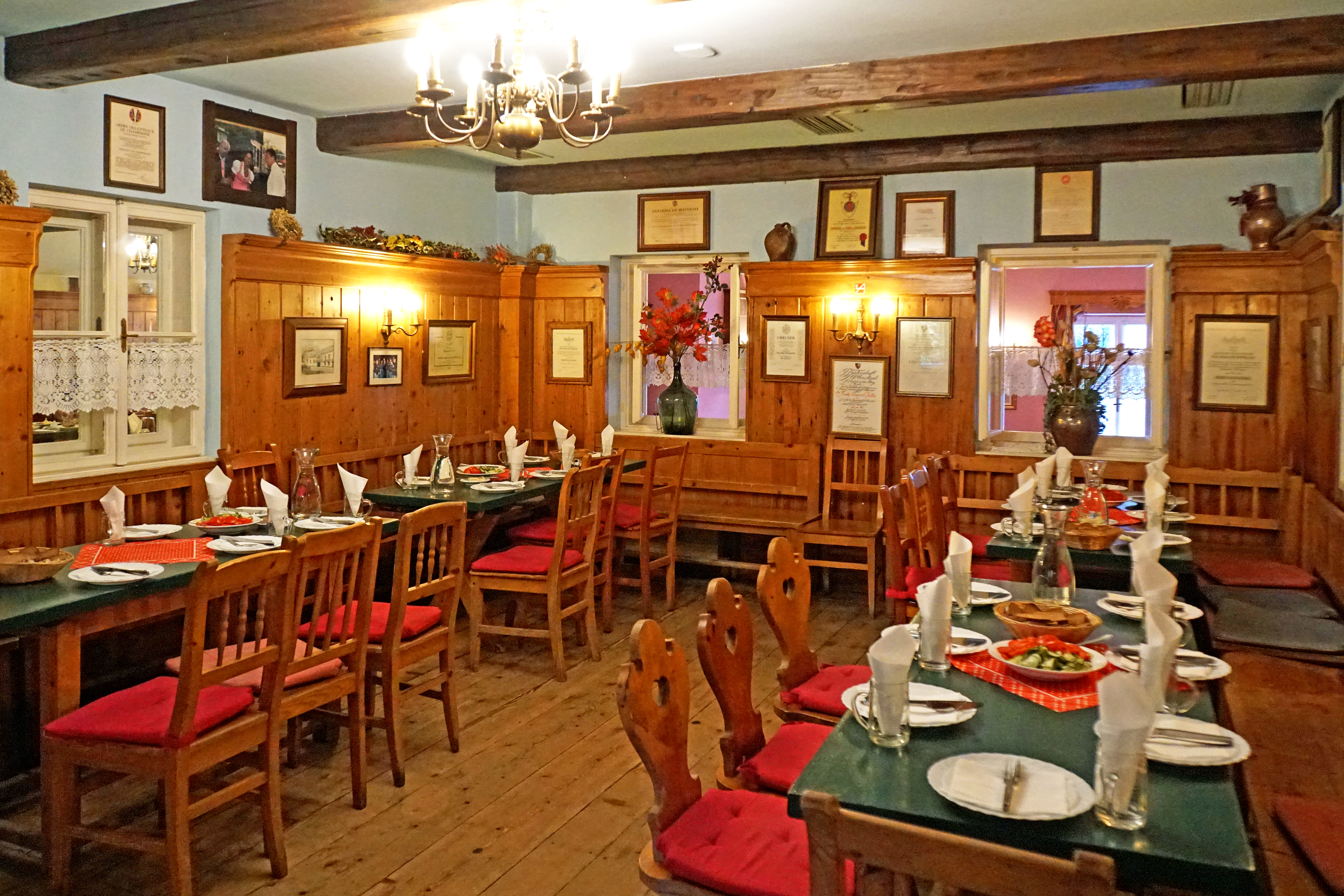
A cosy Stube normally has many wooden elements, giving a feeling of warmth and comfort (inside of Schreiberhaus in Neustift am Walde, Vienna).

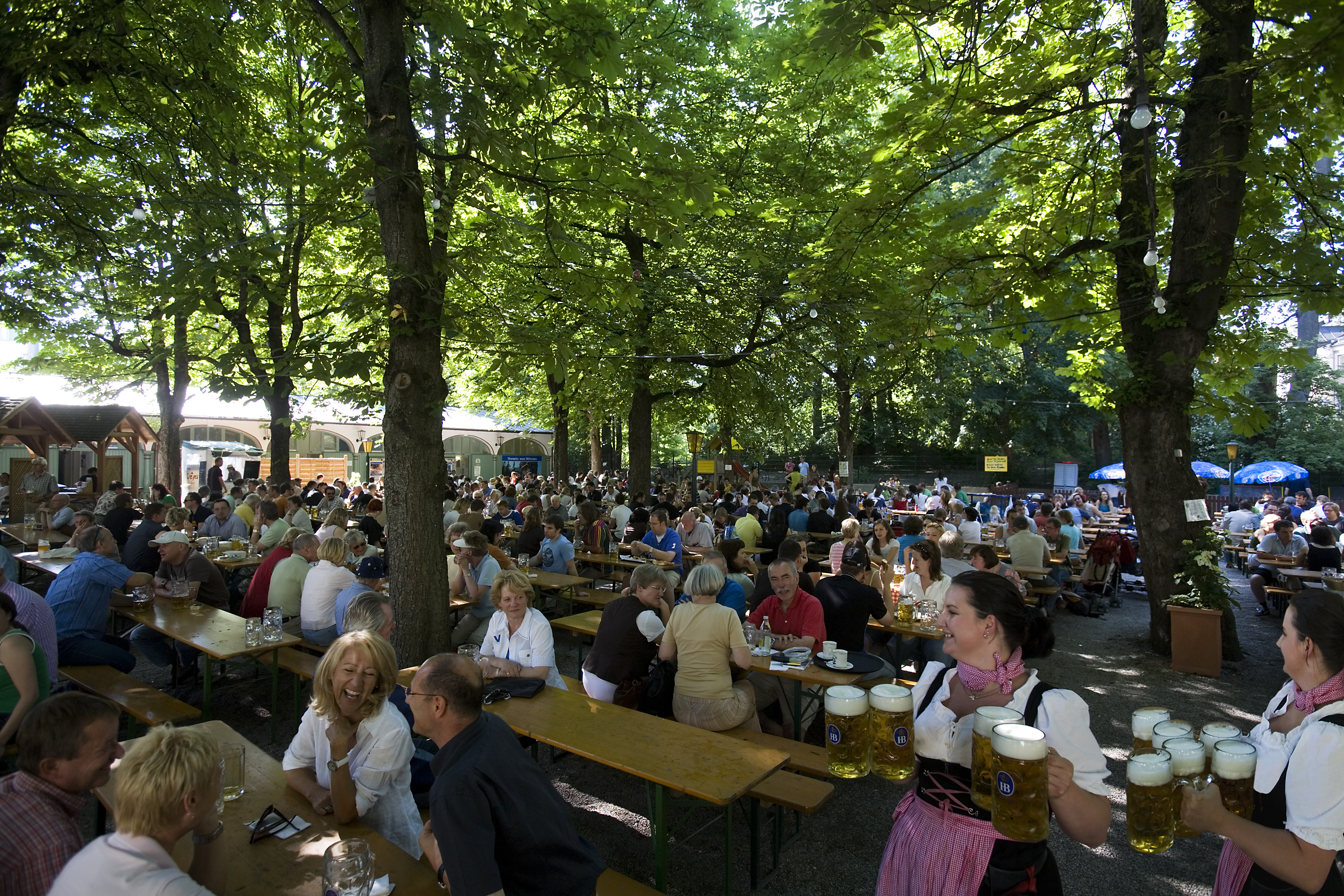
Hofbräukeller garden in Munich, a typical German beergarden scene, permeated by Gemütlichkeit

Gemütlichkeit (German pronunciation: [ɡəˈmyːtlɪçkaɪt]) is a German-language word used to convey the idea of a state or feeling of warmth, friendliness, and good cheer. Other qualities encompassed by the term include cosiness, peace of mind, and a sense of belonging and well-being springing from social acceptance.

== History and etymology ==
"Gemütlichkeit" derives from gemütlich, the adjective of Gemüt, which means "heart, mind, temper, feeling" expressed by (and cognate with) English mood. The German abstract noun Gemütlichkeit has been adopted into English. The current meaning of the word derives from its use in the Biedermeier period. By the second half of the 19th century, it also became associated with a set of traits supposedly unique to the Austrian culture.

The word can be used in descriptions of holidays. In the 1973 English contract law case Jarvis v Swans Tours Ltd, a holidaymaker sued after not receiving the Gemütlichkeit promised by the promotional literature for a package holiday to the Swiss Alps.

The communal connotations of Gemütlichkeit are also emphasized in some uses of the term. For example, one academic described it as a tradition of "public festivity" (in the form of a "mixture of music, food, and drink"), which "promote[d] community solidarity."

Gemütlichkeit has been appropriated at least once to describe the tenor of an economic era rather than spirit of a social gathering. In analyzing the "inflation dampening effects of globalization" an American professor wrote that certain U.S. economic trends could "spell an end of the Gemütlichkeit — a situation in which cheap labor and money abroad as well as ever-increasing productivity at home had permitted an uninterrupted spell of controlled growth in overall prices".

== See also ==
- Quality time
- Lagom
- Hygge
- Simple living
- Slow movement
