= Via media =

Latin phrase

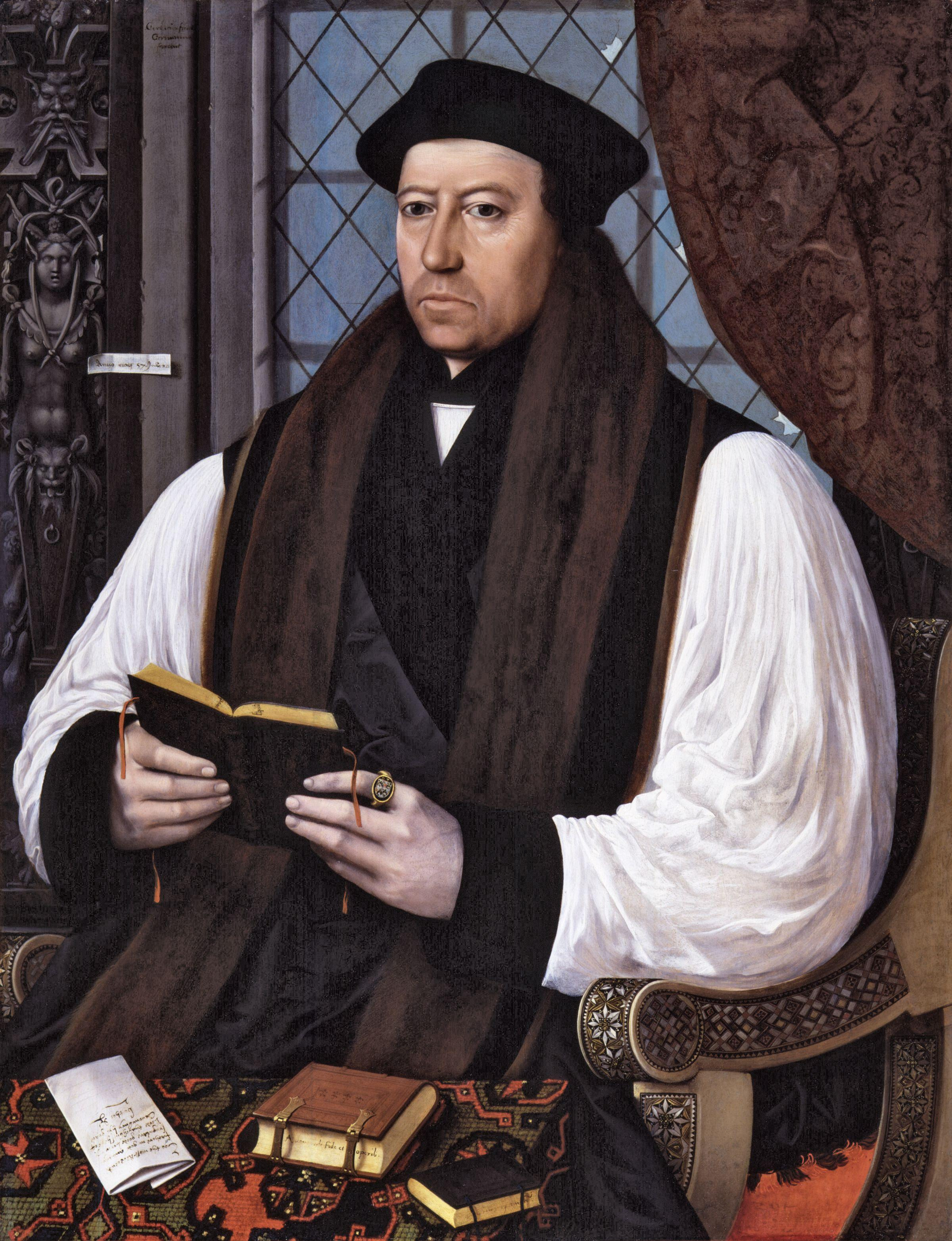
Historian Diarmaid MacCulloch describes Thomas Cranmer as seeking to navigate a middle way between Zurich (Reformed Christianity) and Wittenberg (Lutheranism), though he remarks that the Church of England was ultimately closer to Reformed Christianity.

Via media is a Latin phrase meaning "the middle road" or the "way between (and avoiding or reconciling) two extremes".

Its use in English is highly associated with Anglican self-characterization, or as a philosophical maxim for life akin to the golden mean which advocates moderation in all thoughts and actions.

Originating from the Delphic maxim nothing to excess and subsequent Ancient Greek philosophy where Aristotle (384–322 BC) taught moderation, urging his students to follow the middle road between extremes, the via media was the dominant philosophical precept by which Ancient Roman civilisation and society was organised.

== Patristic period use ==
Augustine's The City of God (chapter 11) uses the phrase via media in the sense of a way connecting two opposing extremes, rather than in the sense of a golden mean or Goldilocks principle.

This is the mediator between God and men, the man Christ Jesus: man, mediator, and way. Because if there is a via media between him who strives and that to whom he strives, there is hope of reaching it.

Boethius has been associated with a variant of the term: Non est medium via (There is no middle way) discussing a life tending to the godly or tending to the bestial.

== Pre-Reformation ==
=== Jean Gerson ===
French theologian and humanist Jean Gerson wrote in his On the Consolation of Theology (1418) about the via media et regia: the middle and royal way. Divine providence and human free will each have a mediating relation on the other: God saves those who humbly condemn themselves as incapacitated but seek him. The middle and royal way is of hope between despair and presumptuousness.

=== Erasmus ===
Erasmus of Rotterdam's irenic but anti-fanatic approach is often classed as a via media, however this can be weighed against his repeated denial of leading a movement or setting up a new church, and may be described as extreme tolerance within Catholic borders.

== Anglicanism ==
The term via media is frequently claimed by Anglican proponents, though not without debate, as a term of apologetics.

The idea of a middle way, was proposed first, early in the Protestant Reformation, as between the Protestant traditions of Lutheranism and Reformed Christianity; subsequently by Richard Hooker as between Puritan and Roman Catholic practices; then by Bishop Hall as between the Calvinist and Arminianist beliefs; and finally by the Tractarians as between Roman Catholicism and the Magisterial Reformers. Historian Hugh Trevor-Roper has argued that the doctrinal history of the English Church is marked by discontinuities.

The idea of the Anglican middle way may also be associated to the teachings of theologians such as Martin Bucer, Thomas Cranmer and Heinrich Bullinger who advocated a religious solution in which secular authority would hold the ring in the religious dispute, and ensure political stability.

=== Historical Anglicanism ===
Anglicanism, which emerged out of the English Reformation, was originally seen as a via media between two forms of Protestantism—Lutheranism and Reformed Christianity. Thomas Cranmer, the Archbishop of Canterbury who played a chief role in shaping Anglicanism, sought a middle way between Lutheranism and Calvinism, though he was closer to Calvinism.

Historic Anglicanism is a part of the wider Reformed tradition, as "the founding documents of the Anglican church—the Book of Homilies, the Book of Common Prayer, and the Thirty-Nine Articles of Religion—expresses a theology in keeping with the Reformed theology of the Swiss and South German Reformation." The Most Rev. Peter Robinson, presiding bishop of the United Episcopal Church of North America, writes:

Cranmer's personal journey of faith left its mark on the Church of England in the form of a Liturgy that remains to this day more closely allied to Lutheran practice, but that liturgy is couple to a doctrinal stance that is broadly, but decidedly Reformed. ... The 42 Articles of 1552 and the 39 Articles of 1563, both commit the Church of England to the fundamentals of the Reformed Faith. Both sets of Articles affirm the centrality of Scripture, and take a monergist position on Justification. Both sets of Articles affirm that the Church of England accepts the doctrine of predestination and election as a 'comfort to the faithful' but warn against over much speculation concerning that doctrine. Indeed a casual reading of the Wurttemburg Confession of 1551, the Second Helvetic Confession, the Scots Confession of 1560, and the XXXIX Articles of Religion reveal them to be cut from the same bolt of cloth.

=== Richard Hooker ===
A recent scholarly study points out that, while Richard Hooker's Law of Ecclesiastical Polity has a reputation as "the classic depiction of the English via media based upon the sound triumvirate of scripture, reason and tradition", the actual term via media nowhere appears in the work (written in English).

Hooker's work concerned the form of Protestant church government as an argument against the extreme advocates of Puritanism, arguing that elements of Church of England practice condemned by the Puritans, in particular the Book of Common Prayer and the institution of bishops, are proper and accord with Scripture.

=== Joseph Hall ===
Bishop of Norwich Joseph Hall (1574–1656) wrote a book Via Media: The Way of Peace, in the five Busy Articles, Commonly Known by the Name of Arminius (1619) in which he argued that Article 6 of the 39 Articles, Of the Sufficiency of the Holy Scriptures for Salvation, precluded adopting officially any doctrine like irresistible grace that were not clear or explicit in Scripture.

=== In Tractarianism ===
Two centuries later, the phrase was used by John Henry Newman in setting out his influential views on Anglicanism, as part of the argument he brought forward with the Tractarian movement. Via Media was the title of a series of the Tracts for Today, published by Newman around 1834 and expanded into published lectures. Newman, at that time, claimed that Anglican Church is, or could be, Catholic because it adopts Reformation theology without Roman accretions, but Apostolic because it kept the hierarchy, sacraments and liturgy.

(A hypothesis, a substitute for direct evidence and hard reasoning) is the Via Media, a possible road, lying between a mountain and a morass, to be driven through formidable obstacles, if it is to exist, by the boldness and skill of the engineers. It is projected and planned for a definite necessity, the necessity of the Anglican position, except for which it would never have been imagined; and, as many other projects and plans, it may be made to look very fair on paper.

— Preface, Via Media, vol 1, Lectures on the Prophetical Office of the Church

Newman's tracts in particular used the title to pay homage to the inception of the Thirty-Nine Articles and in so doing claim that the Tractarian movement was of the same vein as early Church of England scholars and theologians. They examined the Elizabethan Settlement and reinterpreted it as a compromise between Rome and Reform.

The Tractarians promoted the idea of Anglicanism as a middle way between the extremes of Protestantism and Catholicism, which became later an idea of Anglicanism as a middle way between Rome and Protestantism itself.

In justification of its idea of a via media, the Oxford Movement attributed this position to the works of the Elizabethan theologian Richard Hooker and in particular his book Lawes of Ecclesiastical Polity, which is accepted as a founding work on Anglican theology, a view of Hooker promoted by John Keble, who was one of the first to argue that English theology underwent such a "decisive change" in Hooker’s hands. Later theologians analysed Hooker's approach to the particular doctrine of justification by faith as a middle way between the predestinationism of the extreme Calvinists and Lutheran and Arminian doctrines.

The Oxford Movement recast this via media as a middle way not within Protestantism but between Protestantism and Roman Catholicism. Its application to early Anglicanism has remained current in Anglican discourse.

== Nordic Lutheranism ==
Some of the Nordic Lutheran Churches, chiefly the national churches of Sweden, Finland and Norway, likewise consider themselves as via media churches. The latter professes its faith as "truly catholic, truly reformed, truly evangelical", a statement likewise echoed in the Canons of the Church of Sweden which states that the faith, confession and teachings of the Church are understood as an expression of the catholic Christian faith. It further states that this does not serve to create a new, confessionally peculiar interpretation, but concerns the apostolic faith as carried down through the traditions of the Church. These sentiment of these churches as a via media are expressed outright in the Common Statement of the Porvoo Communion, a communion of European Anglican and Nordic and Baltic Lutheran churches:

What made the Church of Sweden an evangelical-catholic church was to Archbishop Söderblom the fact that the Reformation in Sweden was a 'church improvement' and a 'process of purification' which did not create a new church. As a national church, the Church of Sweden succeeded in bringing together medieval Swedish tradition with the rediscovery of the gospel which the Reformation brought with it. Archbishop Söderblom included the historic episcopate in the tradition-transmitting elements. The Church of Sweden was, according to Söderblom, in an even higher degree than the Anglican Church a via media. —Together in Mission and Ministry: The Porvoo Common Statement

== See also ==
- Adiaphora – Concepts in philosophy and religion
- Argument to moderation, a logical fallacy
- Golden mean
- Lagom
- Middle Way
- Wasat (Islamic term)
- Wesleyan Quadrilateral, the Methodist equivalent.
