= Heuriger =

Austrian tavern

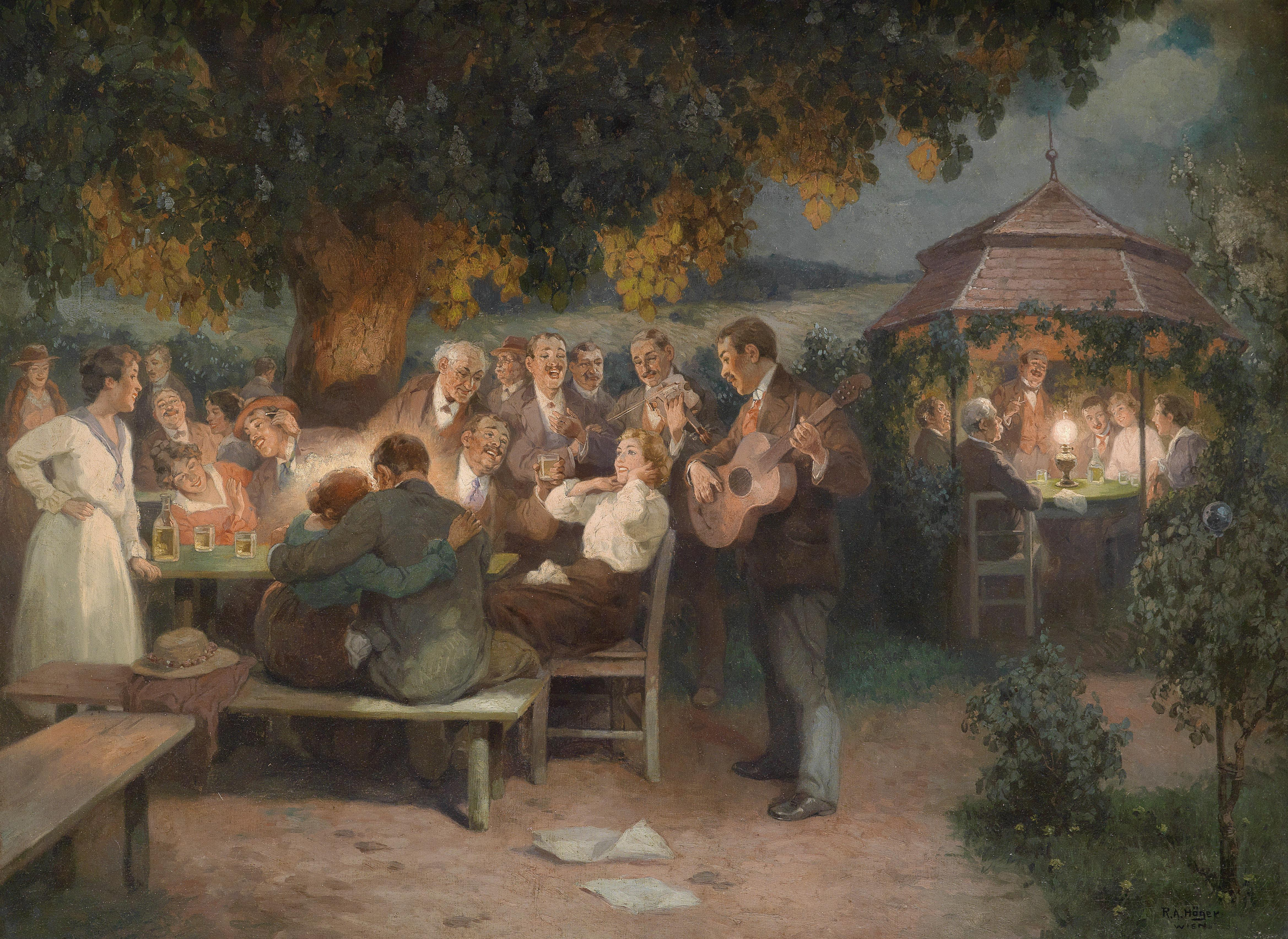
Beim Heurigen in Grinzing, painting by Rudolf Alfred Höger (1900)

In eastern Austria, a Heuriger (German pronunciation: [ˈhɔʏʁɪɡɐ]; Austrian pronunciation: Heiriga, Hungarian: Kurta kocsma) is a tavern where local winemakers serve their new wine under a special licence in alternating months during the growing season. Each state in Austria has slightly varying rules on how many Heuriger of a town can be open at any given time and for how long in total during the year. The Heurige are renowned for their atmosphere of Gemütlichkeit shared among a throng enjoying young wine, simple food, and – in some places – Schrammelmusik. They correspond to the Straußwirtschaften in the German Rheinland, the Frasche in Friuli-Venezia Giulia, and Osmica in Slovenia.

Heuriger is the abbreviation of "heuriger Wein" (this year's wine) in Austrian and Bavarian. Originally, they were simple open-air taverns on the premises of winemakers, where people would bring along food and drink the new wine. Nowadays, the taverns are often situated at a distance from the wineyards and offer both food and drinks. Heurige where apple or pear cider is served are called Mostheurige. In the well-known wine-growing areas of the city of Vienna (Grinzing, Sievering, Neustift, Liesing) many eating establishments have a rustic interior design similar to Heurige, yet they have a normal licence and sell wine they buy from outside sources.

== History ==
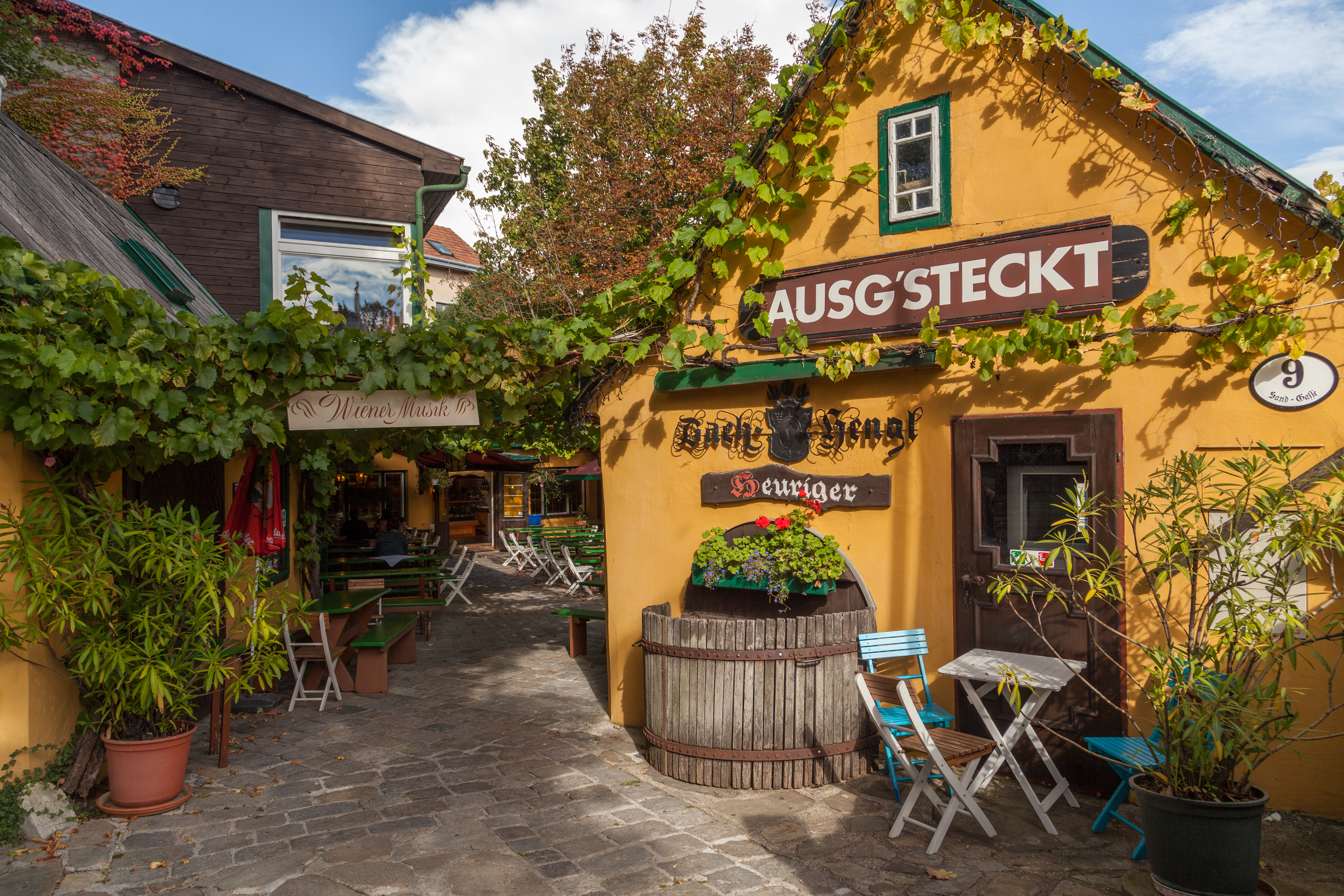
Ausg'steckt sign at a Heuriger in Grinzing, which announced that wine was being sold

On 17 August 1784 Austrian Emperor Joseph II issued a decree that permitted all residents to open establishments to sell and serve self-produced wine and juices. At first no food could be sold in order to prevent competition with restaurants, but over time these restrictions lessened.

Ausg'steckt would be a sign that the wine farmer was serving out the wine at a Heuriger.

Over the years well-known areas for Heurigen developed, including Dürnstein, Gainfarn, Gamlitz, Guntramsdorf, Gumpoldskirchen, Grinzing, Königstetten, Langenlois, Mauer, Neustift am Walde, Perchtoldsdorf, Pfaffstätten, Rust, Sievering, Traiskirchen, Tribuswinkel and the Wachau region.

Many of the towns also hold a yearly festival, often called a Großheuriger, meaning "big Heuriger", where all the Heuriger of the town hold a multi-day street festival. The biggest in Austria is the Großheuriger Pfaffstätten that is held annually during summer.

Similar establishments exist in wine-producing regions elsewhere in Austria, known as Buschenschank in Styria, and Straußen, Besenwirtschaft, or Heckenwirtschaft in Germany and other German-speaking areas.

== Atmosphere ==
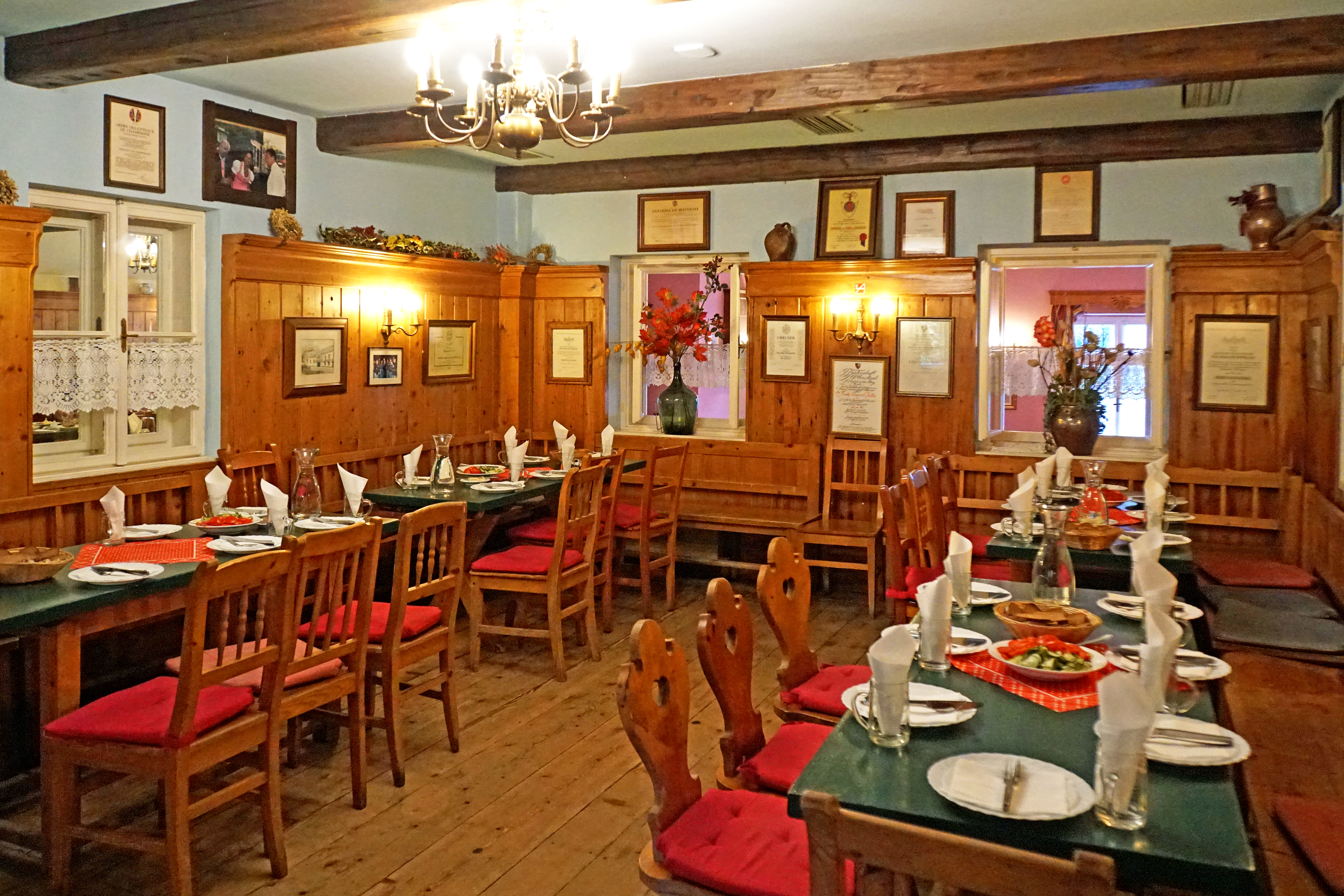
A cosy Stube of the Schreiberhaus in Neustift am Walde, Vienna

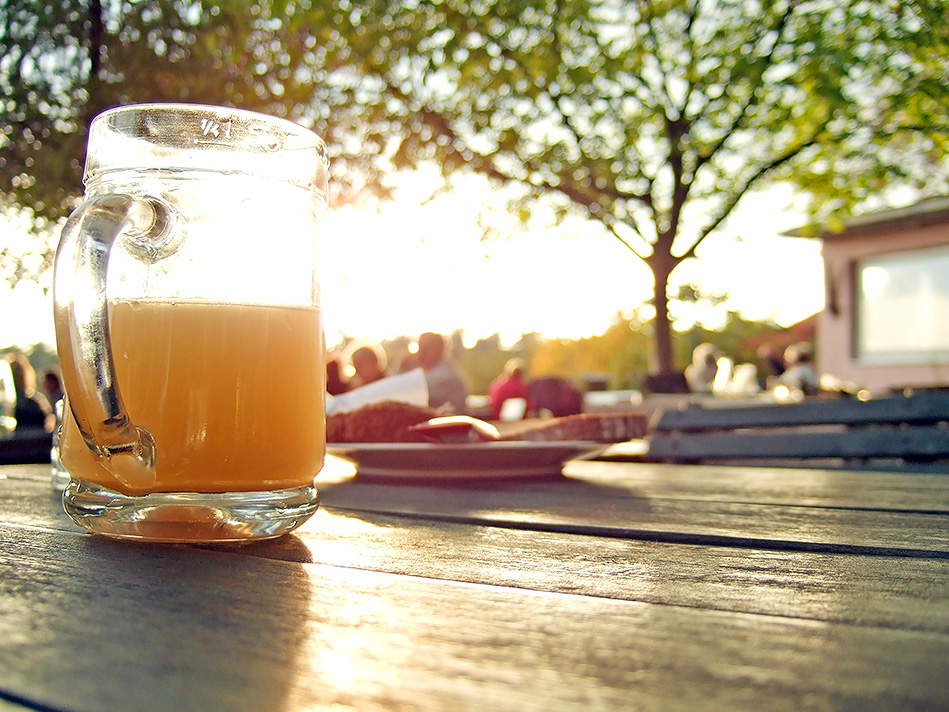
Sturm young wine is traditionally served at a Heuriger

A Heuriger is prized both for the charms of what it offers and its limitations. Each Heuriger is only open briefly, usually 2 or 3 weeks during a four-month season in the fall, although it may reopen again later in the season when more wine has been produced. It serves only its own wine, and a limited selection of food as an evening meal, generally local, homemade products offered as small dishes such as Liptauer spread, various meat or sausage and Semmel combinations, or cheese boards.

Typical drinks found at Heurigen include Sturm, a partially fermented wine sold at the beginning of fall that still contains a fair amount of grape, and Gruner Veltliner, which is one of the most popular types of Austrian wine. Almdudler and Gespritzer are also commonly found at modern Heurigen. Lucky patrons will sometimes find Eiswein to enjoy with dessert.

Heurigen indicate that they are open and guests welcome by displaying a handful of conifer or fir twigs bound in a circular Buschen hung above the entrance door. Until the 20th century, it was customary for guests to bring along their own food when enjoying wine at a Heuriger. To make an establishment more profitable, in many places the tavern was leased to other winemakers (Winzer in German), known as Winzerstuben.

Gemütlichkeit shared among a throng enjoying young wine, simple food, and traditional music is one of the greatest appeals of a Heuriger. As a result, many establishments elsewhere, such as in Vienna, are made to look like Heurigen but in fact are licensed restaurants selling wines from outside sources; these even serve beer and coffee, unthinkable at an authentic Heuriger.

== Music ==
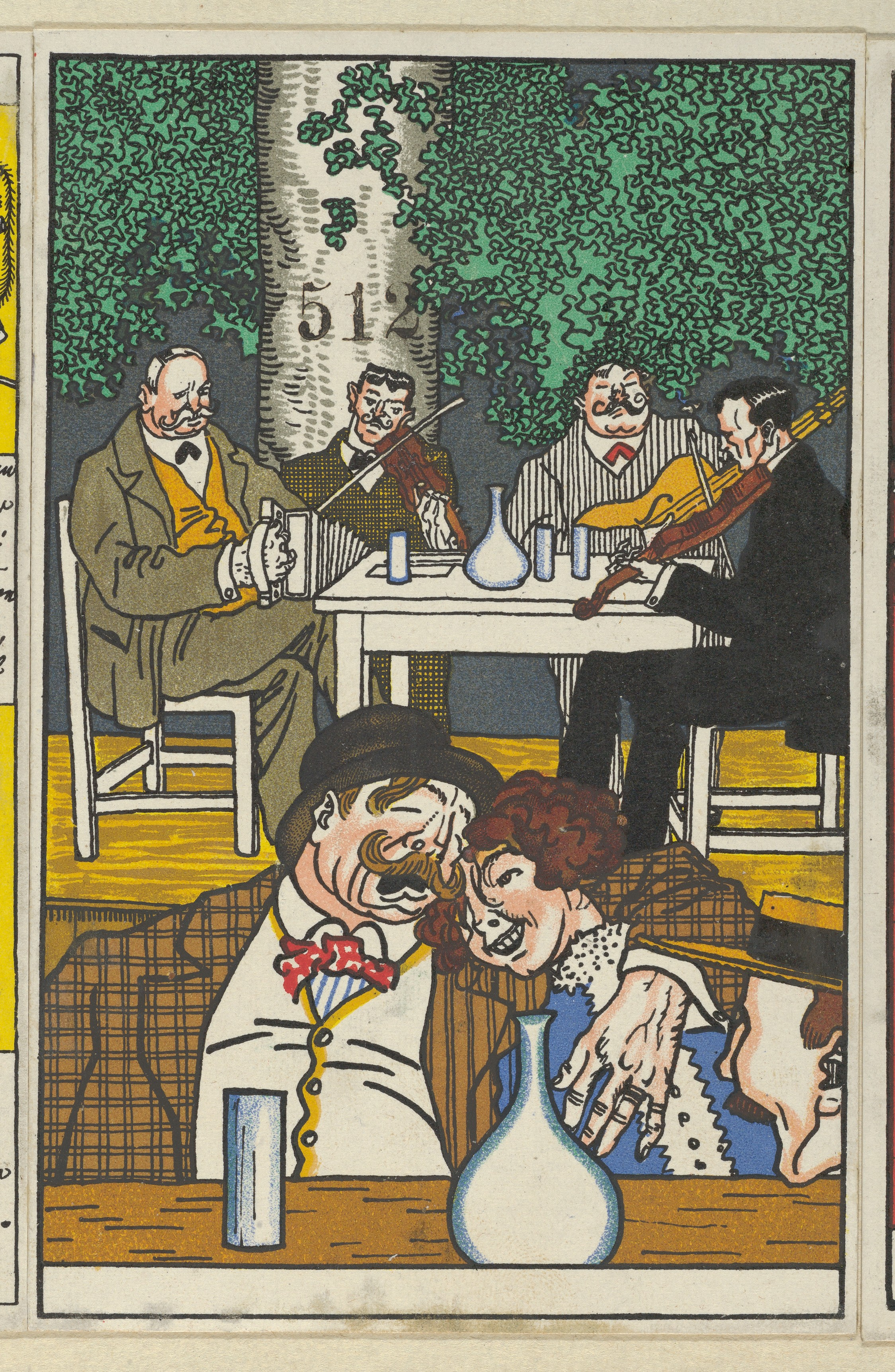
At the Heuriger (Beim Heurigen) depicting musicians playing for guests, print by Moriz Jung (1911)

Music has traditionally been part of the Heuriger ambiance and contributes greatly to its Gemütlichkeit. When present today it is typically provided by a pair of Heurigensänger who serenade from table to table for tips. Playing a guitar and accordion, they take requests for songs from their repertoire of Wienerlieder and Schrammelmusik.

These songs' themes invariably revolve around the quality of the wine, its consumption and consequences, Vienna's beauty, a nostalgic longing for the past, the transience of life, the inevitability of suffering and death at God's will, and, to a somewhat lesser degree, romantic love.

Even trying to honor the Heuriger tradition, music has changed dramatically since performers such as The Third Man sensation Anton Karas earned a living by playing his Zither or Hans Moser sang a Wienerlied from his movies. Visitors from Germany will hope to hear songs from their native land, as will those from others; the Heurigensänger will try their best.

== See also ==
- Strausse
- Straußwirtschaften
- Frasche
- Federweisser
- Grüner Veltliner
- Almdudler
- Gespritzer
- Eiswein
