= Anglo-Orthodoxy =

Anglo-Orthodoxy can refer to either:

- A movement among Anglicans toward incorporating some elements of Eastern Orthodox spirituality, theology or worship into the Anglican churches, or a movement that portrays Anglicanism as a via media between Western and Eastern Christianity (by analogy with the term Anglo-Catholicism). More info on Anglo-Orthodoxy can be found at angloorthodox.com.
- Western Rite Orthodoxy using Anglican-derived liturgies
