= Hunger artist =

Performers who starved themselves for paying audiences

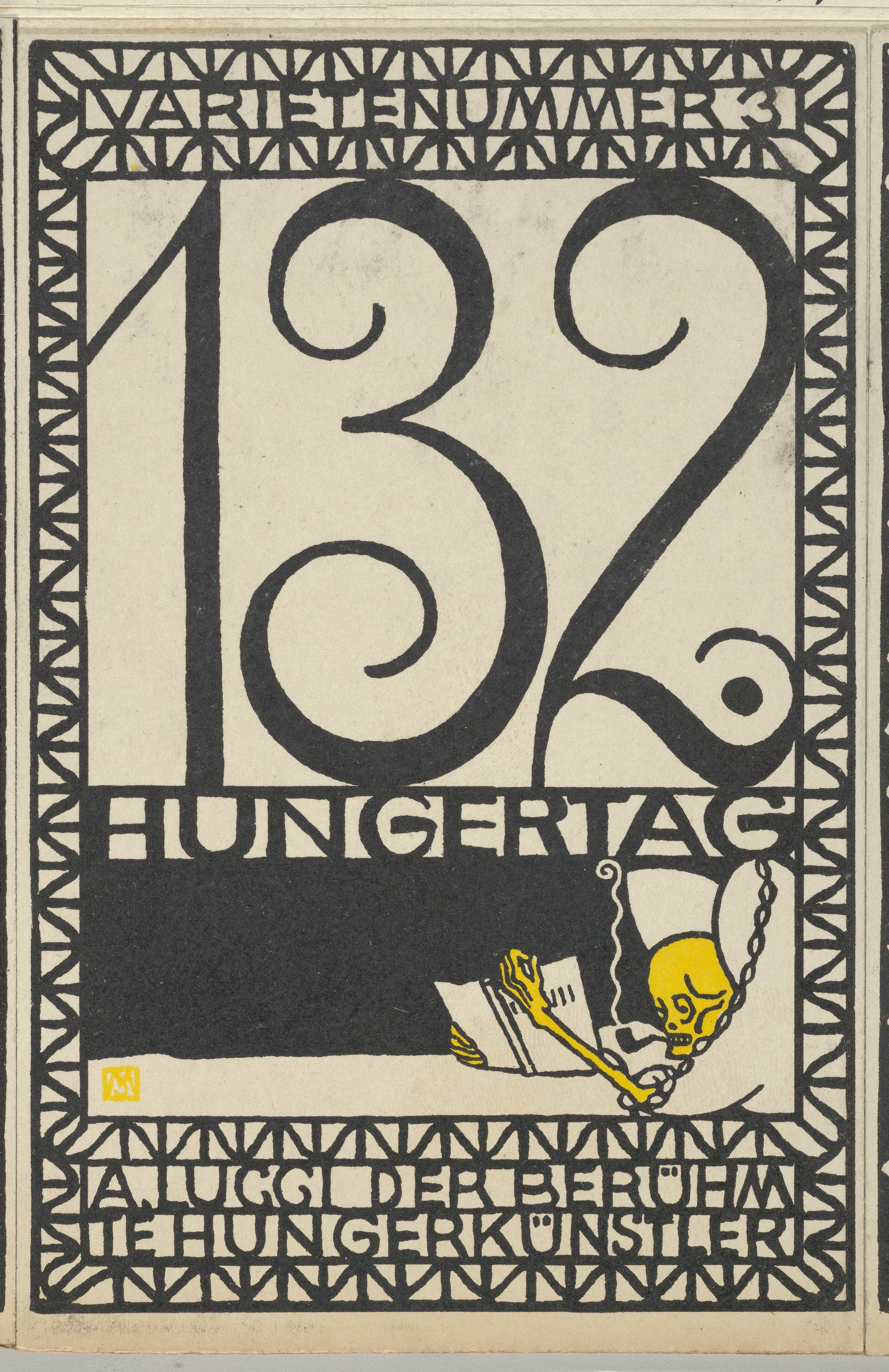
Lithograph by Moriz Jung, 1907, "Variety Act 3- 132nd Day of Fasting, A. Lucci the Famous Hunger Artist"

Hunger artists or starvation artists were performers, common in Europe and America in the 18th, 19th and early 20th centuries, who starved themselves for extended periods of time, for the amusement of paying audiences. The phenomenon first appeared in the 17th century and saw its heyday in the 1880s. Hunger artists were almost always male, traveled from city to city and performed widely advertised fasts of up to 40 days. Several hunger artists were found to have cheated during their performances.

The phenomenon has been relayed to modern audiences through Franz Kafka's 1922 short story "A Hunger Artist", contained in the collection of the same name.

Hunger artists should be distinguished from two other phenomena of the time: "Fasting Women" such as Martha Taylor and Ann Moore who refused to eat while staying home, usually explained as some kind of miracle and later exposed as fraud; and "Living Skeletons", people of exceptionally low body weight performing in freak shows. Sigal Gooldin sees hunger artists as "a modern spectacular version of the disciplined self" that can be interpreted in Foucauldian terms in the context of "the modern governmentality of 'biopower'".
