= Moderation =

Process of eliminating or lessening extremes

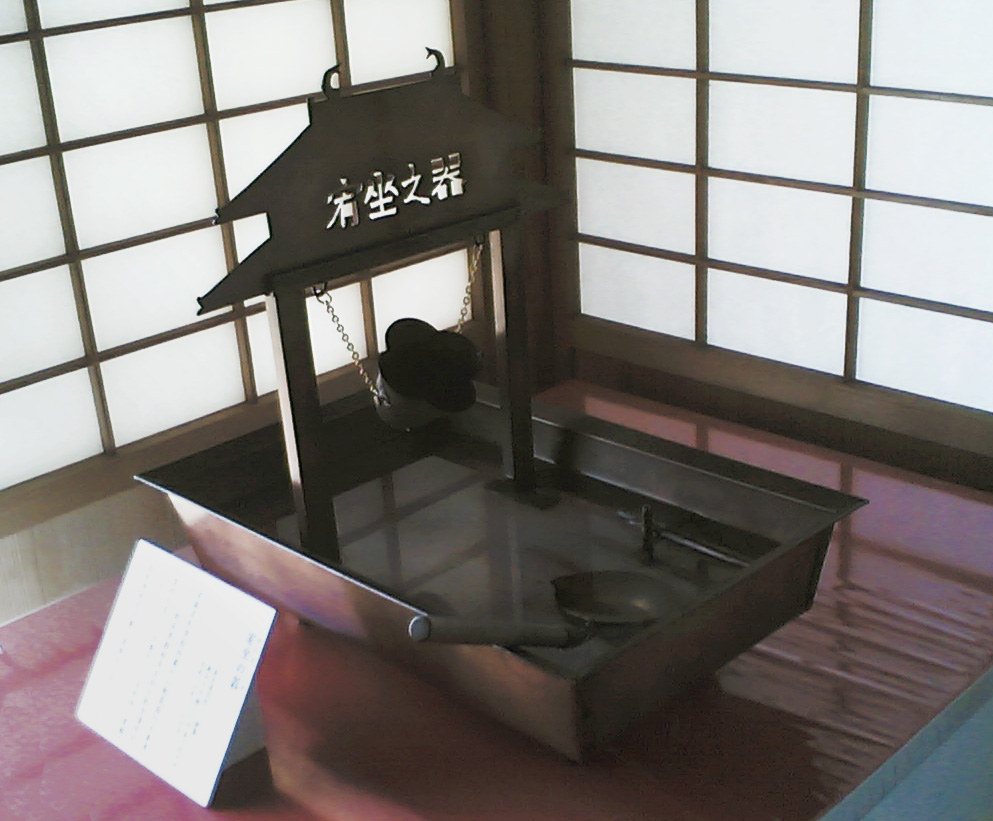
A teaching material in Ashikaga Gakko (Japan) to teach students the importance of moderations. The cup is inclined when it's empty. When you pour water into it, it goes upright. If you pour more water, it becomes inclined again.

Moderation is the process or trait of eliminating, lessening, or avoiding extremes. It is used to ensure normality throughout the medium on which it is being conducted. Common uses of moderation include:

- A way of life emphasizing perfect amounts of everything, not indulging in too much of one thing.
- A moderator may remove unsuitable contributions from the website, forum or chat room they represent in accordance with their moderation system.
- Ensuring consistency and accuracy in the marking of student assessments.
- A "moderator" is one name for the formal position of one who presides over a discussion, helping to ensure that the discussion is balanced among its many voices, for example in the Methodist church's use of the term for the heads of its conferences.
- A neutron moderator is used to slow down neutrons in a nuclear reactor.

== History ==
=== Ancient Greece ===
Moderation is also a principle of life. In ancient Greece, the temple of Apollo at Delphi bore the inscription Meden Agan (μηδὲν ἄγαν)—"Nothing in excess". Doing something "in moderation" means not doing it excessively. For instance, someone who moderates their food consumption tries to eat all food groups, but limits their intake of those that may cause deleterious effects to harmless levels.

According to the historian and sociologist of science Steven Shapin:

From the pre-Socratics through the Hippocratic and Galenic corpus, and in the writings of such Stoic philosophers as Epictetus and Seneca, health was seen to flow from observing moderation—in exercise, in study, and in diet.

=== Christianity ===
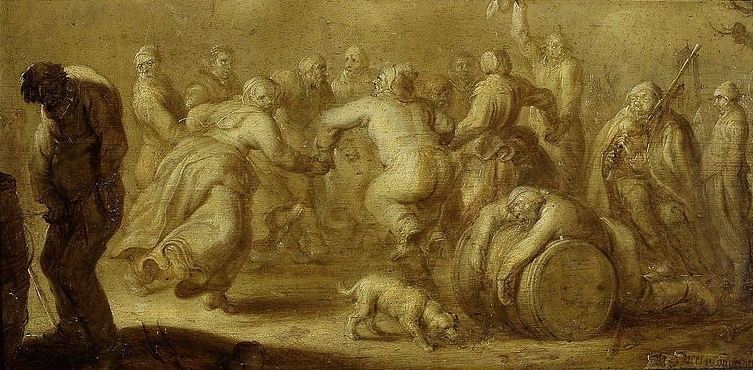
Everything in moderation, illustration of a proverb by Adriaen van de Venne, 1650s, National Museum in Warsaw

In Christianity, moderationism is the position that drinking alcoholic beverages temperately is permissible, though drunkenness is forbidden (see Christianity and alcohol).

In the apocryphal Book of Wisdom moderation is listed among the greatest virtues.

=== Islam and Judaism ===
Wasat, also called wasatiyyah (Arabic: وسطية) is the Arabic word for best, middle, centered, balanced. In the Islamic context, it refers to the "middle way" or "moderation"—a justly balanced way of life, avoiding extremes and experiencing things in moderation.

The Jewish philosopher Maimonides, who was heavily influenced by Islamic and Aristotelian thought, also set forth moderation as an ideal within Judaism.

=== Taoism ===
Moderation is considered a key part of one's personal development in Chinese Taoist philosophy and religion. It is one of the three jewels of Taoist thought. There is nothing that cannot be moderated including one's actions, one's desires, and even one's thoughts. It is believed that by doing so one achieves a more natural state, faces less resistance in life, and recognises one's limits. Moderation as a guiding principle is complex and can be difficult to not only accept, but also understand and implement. It can also be recursive in that one should moderate how much one moderates (i.e. to not be too worried about moderating everything or not to try too hard to find the perfect middle ground)

Moderation as a principle of Taoist philosophy turns up in all three of its main texts.

=== Others ===
Moderation is a characteristic of the Swedish national psyche, more specifically described by the Swedish synonym Lagom.

== See also ==
- Aparigraha – Philosophy that holds that no one or anything possesses anything
- Golden mean (philosophy) – Aphorism against extremism
- Middle Way (Dhammacakkappavattana Sutta)
- Modesty – Mode of dress and deportment which intends to avoid encouraging of sexual attraction in others
- Temperance – Cardinal virtue of control over excess
