= Strausse =

Type of wine tavern

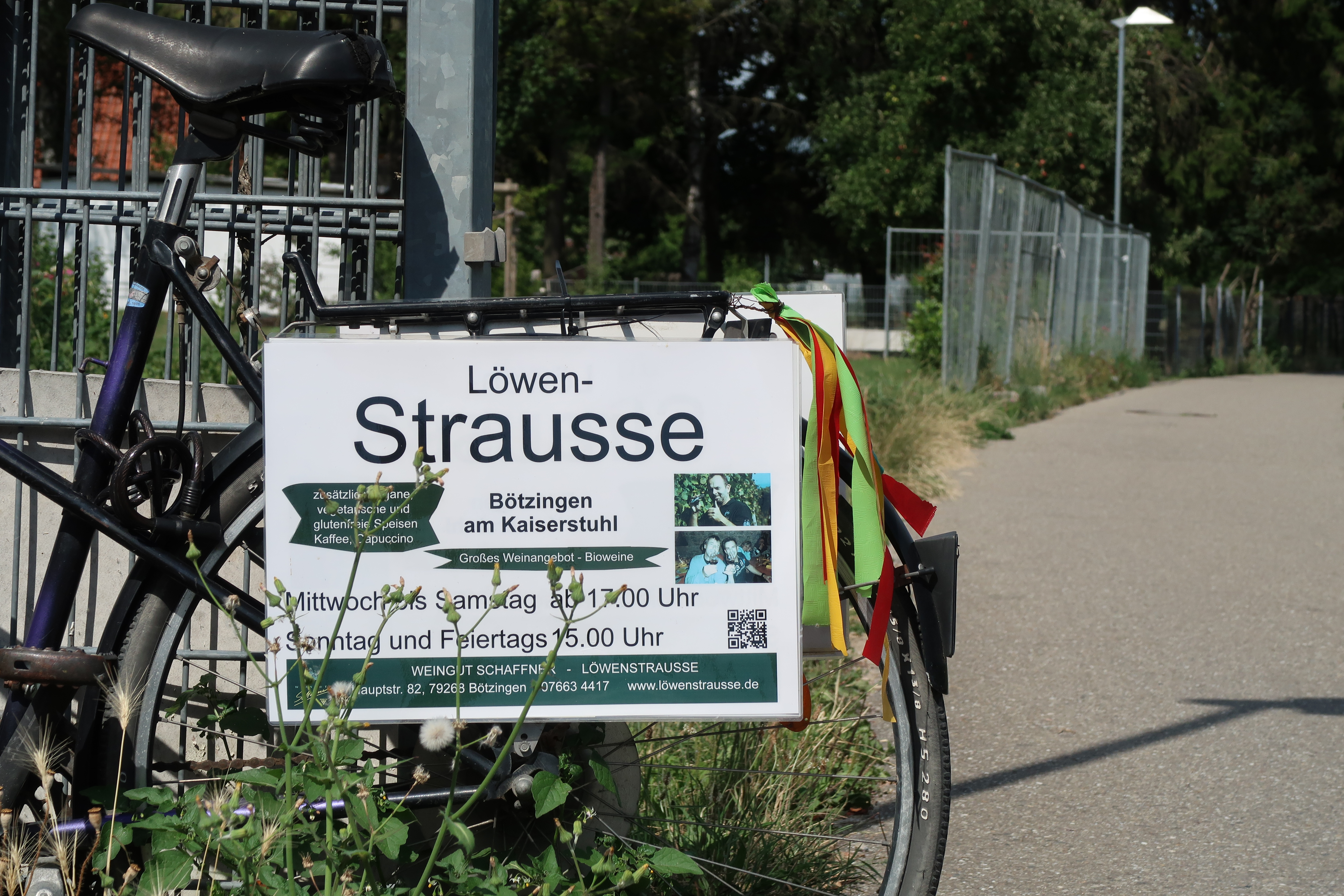
Information sign on a bicycle to a 'Strausse', a private wine licence in Boetzingen, Germany

A Strausse or Strausswirtschaft (also Strauße or Straußwirtschaft) is a type of wine tavern in winegrowing areas of German-speaking countries that is only open during certain times of the year. Typically it is a pub run by winegrowers and winemakers themselves, in which they sell their own wine directly to the public. The food served needs to be simple, regional cold dishes. Other expressions like Besenwirtschaft and Besenschänke ("broom pub"), Rädlewirtschaft ("cyclists' pub") as well as Hecken- or Häckerwirtschaft are also common.

== Characterization ==
A Strausswirtschaft is essentially understood to be a winemaker serving his own wine on his own premises. These seasonal inns are not subject to normal business laws and are thus not obliged to have a licence or to pay extra taxes. They must, however, fulfil certain conditions instead. These conditions vary from state to state but they are in general agreement on certain essential points (see "Legal aspects" below).

The kinds of locations in which a Strausswirtschaft can be found can vary considerably. Besides ones furnished like ordinary pubs there are also simple barns where benches and tables have been temporarily set up to accommodate guests. In earlier decades some winegrowers even cleared their flats or the stables to run such a tavern. In Austria this kind of pub is called a Buschenschank or Heuriger. The name is derived from a bar or post to which a so-called Föhrenbusch or a Reisigbesen (a kind of besom or broom) was attached. This helps to explain another expression associated with the Strausswirtschaft: Ausg'steckt is' ("It is attached"). By attaching the bar outside, the pub owner was informing the tax collector about the pub's tax liability. The Buschenschank and the expression Ausg'steckt is' can be traced back to a regulation by Empress Maria Theresia.

== Origins ==
The enactment "Capitulare de villis vel curtis imperii" by Charlemagne is often mentioned as the historical standard for the Strausswirtschaft. It enabled winemakers to sell their own products free of business tax. The Strausswirtschaft (Strauss – German for bunch of flowers; Wirtschaft – pub, inn) had to be marked as such by a bunch of flowers put up at the entrance.

Typical dishes offered are rather simple and rich. Regional specialities are for instance:

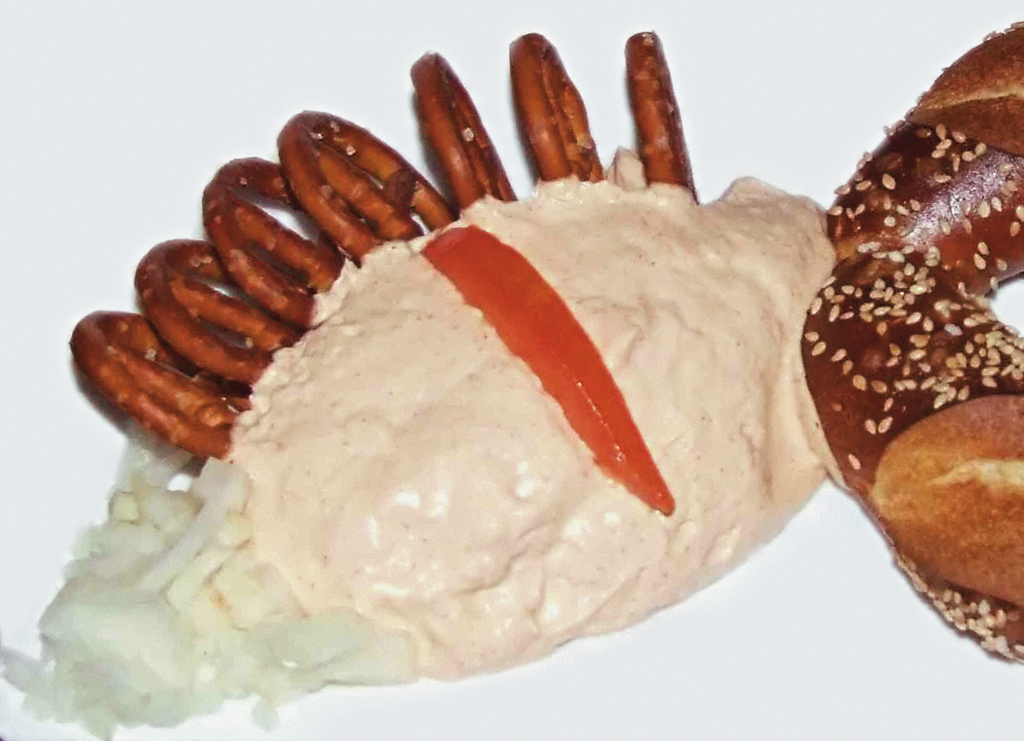
Spundekäs with pretzels

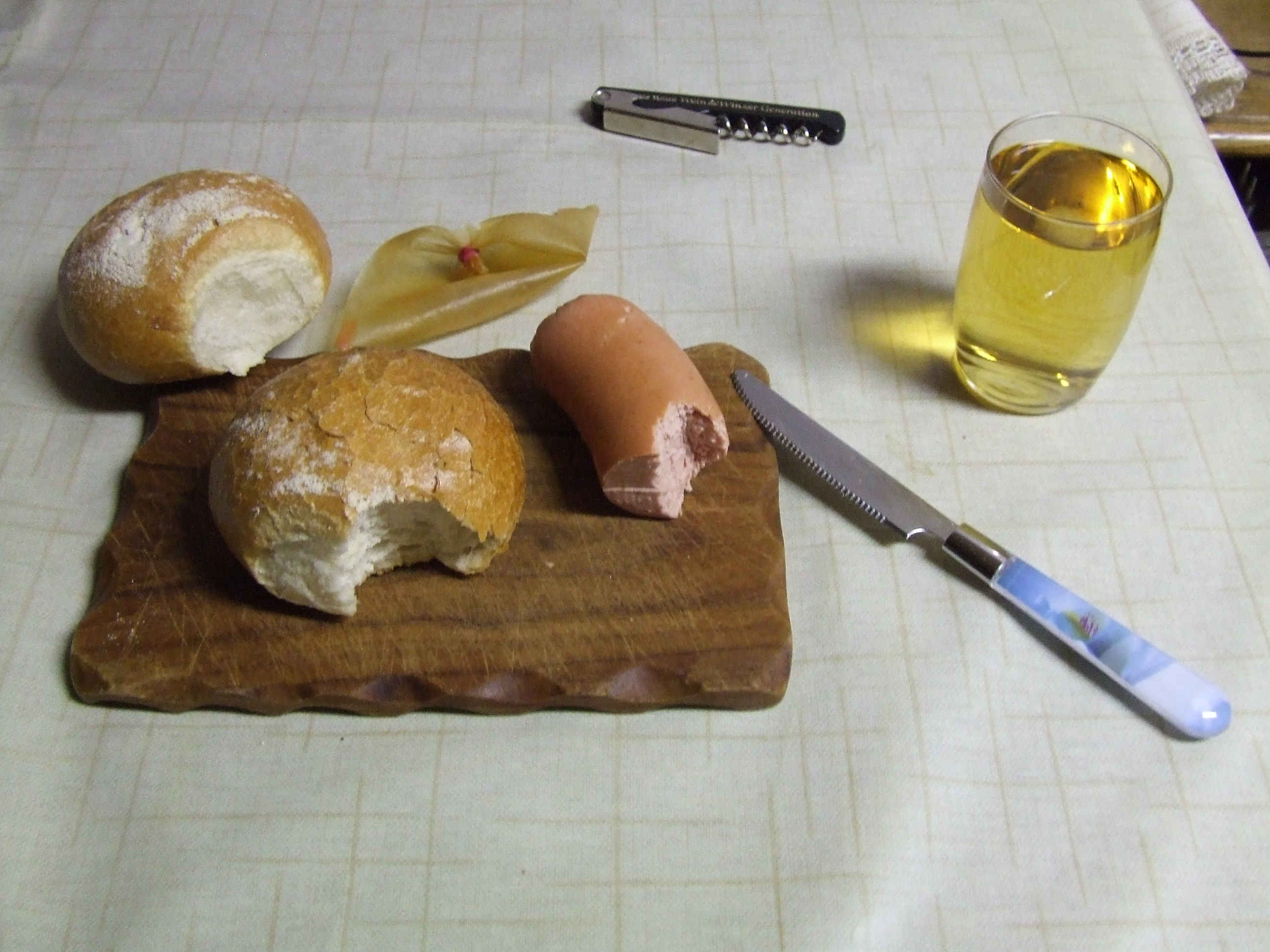
Weck, Worscht un Woi

- Schlachtplatte (black pudding, liverwurst and sauerkraut)
- Spundekäs in Rhenish Hesse and the Rheingau
- Weck, Worscht un Woi in Rhenish Hesse, the Rheingau and the Palatinate
- Pfälzer Saumagen (Palatine sow's stomach)
- Maultaschen (Swabian pockets) with potato salad
- Winzerteller (sausage and cheese dish)
- Wurstsalat (sausage salad)
- Zwiebelkuchen (onion pie)
- Flammkuchen (Tarte flambée)
- Bratwurst and Kraut
- Blaue Zipfel (in Franconia)
- Dressed Camembert (in Franconia)
- Kuhkäs (in Franconia - a cheese dish)

Elaborate dishes are not allowed.

== Legal aspects ==
Almost nowhere are Strausswirtschaften considered restaurants, which means that owners do not need a concession. Nevertheless, the trade office needs to be notified in advance about the period during which the Strausswirtschaft intends to sell food and drink. Although Strausswirtschaften do not need a licence, there are certain laws they have to follow. Among other things, a Strausswirtschaften is not allowed to offer lodging or engage in trade. Food and beverage must be served at the place of production. It is forbidden to rent any extra facilities for serving food and beverage. The following rules need to be respected:

- Selling food and drink is limited to four months a year
- The opening times can be divided into two periods.
- There is a maximum capacity of 40 seats. There are no rules, however, dictating the number of people permitted to squeeze in on the benches or likewise the number of people allowed to stand around drinking their wine. Exception: In Rhineland-Palatinate there is no limit on the number of seats.
- A minimum of hygiene has to be considered and is subject to public control
- Strausswirtschaften are only allowed to serve very simple dishes. Hot sausages and loin ribs with sauerkraut are given as such an example in the regulations as well as coffee and cake.
- Beer and other alcoholic beverages (excluding wine) must not be served. Home distilled spirits, however, are allowed. Alongside wine and/or cider at least one non-alcoholic drink has to be offered. Tap water is explicitly excluded.

== Similar economies ==
=== Austria ===
In Austria there are similar forms of such an economy with the "Buschenschank" or with the Heuriger (derived from "Heurigen" wine, which by law may only be served as a Heuriger up to a certain age). While in the Buschenschank - regulated in § 111 of the Austrian Trade Regulations and in the Buschenschank laws as provincial laws of the federal states - alcoholic beverages from the company's own premises as well as cold dishes may be offered, a trade license is required for the expansion to include hot dishes (for a Heurigen buffet) for a hospitality business.

The name "Buschenschank" is derived from a pole to which a green bush or brushwood broom is stuck in front of the entrance. In Vienna, for example, this "Buschenschankzeichen [...] has to consist of a pine, fir or spruce bush." (Section 6 (2) Vienna Buschenschankgesetz). In parts of Lower Austria, the Buschenschankzeichen is a plaited straw wreath.

=== Switzerland ===
This special form of “bar areas and restaurants” as a sideline for agricultural businesses is regulated in Switzerland in the respective cantonal hospitality laws and, depending on the region, is also called “Besenbeiz”, “Besenwirtschaft” or “Buschenschenke”.

== See also ==
- Heuriger
- German wine
- German cuisine
