= Middle state =

Impartiality in Tamil philosophy

The State of the Middle (Tamil: நடுவு நிலைமை, naṭuwu nilaimai) refers to the virtue of impartiality, avoiding excess and preserving equity in Tamil philosophy. It is not to be confused with (Tamil: நடுநிலை கொள்கை, naṭunilai koḷgai) which refers to the ideology of neutralism. The phrase was introduced as the name of both the concept and a chapter in the Tirukkuṟaḷ by Tiruvaḷḷuvar. It is referred to from Kurals 111 to 120. The Kural 113 summarises the concept as follows:

Forsake in the very moment (of acquisition) that gain which, though it should bring advantage, is without equity.

— Tirukkuṟaḷ, Aṟattuppāl, Illaṟaviyal, Naṭuwunilaimai, 113)

== Etymology ==
In the Tamil language, நடுவு (naṭuwu) means 'centre' and நிலை (nilai) means 'state'; நிலைமை (nilaimai) can be roughly translated as 'the state of being at'.

== Tiruvaḷḷuvar ==
Tiruvaḷḷuvar opined that the wisdom of those who follow the State of the Middle will be an unperishing example for future generations (K112). He said those who are virtuous (தக்கார்), that is follow the State of the Middle, or vicious (தகவிலர்), or those who diverge from the State of the Middle, will be known by the nature of peoples' opinion of them (K114). While life's goodness may fluctuate naturally, people are still obliged to keep the State of the Middle (K115). Should following the State of the Middle result in ones low estate, the wise shower them with praise still (K117). Suppose one should consider diverging from the State of the Middle, one should prepare for impending ruin (K116). To incline neither side like a set of scales is a sign of a virtue (K118). If one's soul is impartial, one cannot be of obliquitous promises, that is always expected to keep one's word (K119) and is expected to be impartial to friends, strangers and enemies (K111). Tiruvaḷḷuvar concludes by saying that even traders are expected to protect the goods of others as if it were their own (K120).

== Other references ==
=== Kaṉiyan Pūngunṟanār ===
The concept has an intrinsic place in Tamil society. It is referred to vaguely by Kaṉiyan Pūngunṟanār in the Puṟanāṉūṟu when he suggests it that life should neither be full of pleasure nor full of sorrow.

=== Bharthiyar ===
Bharathiyar makes a reference to நடுமை நிலை in his (Tamil: குயில் பாட்டு, kuyil pāṭṭu).

== Ancient Tamil law ==
Manimekalai details that kings and judges were expected to be impartial, and measure the guilt of the offender and grant punishment accordingly without being too excessive. Any divergence from justice was said to resemble a river of milk with a water current in its course.

== See also ==
- Aristotle's "Golden Mean" and a central theme of Aristotelian ethics.
- Confucius's Doctrine of the Mean
- Buddhist philosophy's Middle Way
