= Lagom =

Swedish word for just the right amount

Pronunciation of lagom
Pronunciation of lagom. Male speaker.

Lagom (pronounced [ˈlɑ̂ːɡɔm]) is a Swedish word meaning 'just the right amount' or 'not too much, not too little'.

The word can be variously translated as 'in moderation', 'in balance', 'perfect-simple', 'just enough', 'ideal' and 'suitable' (in matter of amounts). Whereas words like sufficient and average suggest some degree of abstinence, scarcity, or failure, lagom carries the connotation of appropriateness, although not necessarily perfection. The archetypical Swedish proverb "Lagom är bäst", literally 'The right amount is best', is also translated as 'Enough is as good as a feast', or as 'There is virtue in moderation'.

== Etymology ==
The origin of the term is an archaic dative plural form of lag ('law'), in this case referring not necessarily to judicial law but common-sense law. Literally meaning 'according to law', a closer translation would be 'according to custom' or 'according to common sense'. The earliest attestations of the word are from 17th-century texts.

A common false etymology claims that it is a contraction of laget om ('around the team'); according to this myth, the phrase was used in Viking times to specify how much mead one should drink from the horn as it was passed around in order for everyone to receive a fair share.

== Use ==
Lagom is most often used as an adverb, as in the sentence "Han är lagom lång" (literally 'He is just the right height'). Lagom can also be used as an adjective: "Klänningen var lagom för henne" (literally 'The dress was just right for her'), which would be equivalent to 'The dress fits her'. The adjective form is never inflected.

== Cultural significance ==
The value of "just enough" can be compared to the idiom "less is more", or contrasted to the value of "more is better". It is viewed favorably as a sustainable alternative to the hoarding extremes of consumerism: "Why do I need more than two? Det är [It is] lagom" It can also be viewed as repressive: "You're not supposed to be too good, or too rich".

In a single word, lagom is said to describe the basis of the Swedish national psyche, one of consensus and equality. "My aunt used to hold out her closed fist and say, "How much can you get in this hand? It's much easier to get something in this [open] hand".

== Comparable terms in other languages ==
The word "lagom" also exists in Norwegian, in both Bokmål and Nynorsk. The connotations in Norwegian, however, are somewhat different from Swedish. In Norwegian the word has synonyms as 'fitting, suitable, comfortable, nice, decent, well built/proportioned'. While some synonyms are somewhat similar in meaning (e.g. 'suitable' and 'reasonable', 'fitting' and 'in balance'), many present in Swedish do not exist in Norwegian and vice versa. The Norwegian words passelig and the more common passe are very similar, translating roughly as 'fitting, adequate, suitable' in English. Passe can be used in every context where the Swedish lagom is used, e.g. passe varm ('right temperature/adequately warm'), passe stor ('right size'), etc.

Finnish has the word sopivasti, which carries similar connotations of 'just right'.

The concept of lagom is similar to the Russian or Ukrainian expression normal'no (нормально, literally 'normally'), which indicates a sufficient and sustainable state, for example of one's livelihood. In Russian, the word is often used as an answer to the question "how are you?". Polish w sam raz means the same as lagom. Comparable terms are found in some south Slavic languages, for example Serbo-Croatian umereno or umjereno. In Slovak, the expression tak akurát is used.

Ιn ancient Greek, there was the famous phrase of Cleobulus, metron ariston (μέτρον ἄριστον), meaning 'moderation [literally: measure] is best'.

In Albanian, the word taman has the same meaning. It is derived from Ottoman Turkish tamam meaning 'precisely', borrowed from Arabic where it means 'complete, perfect'. In Albanian, it is used in essentially the same way as lagom, as in "a taman amount", "not a taman person" ('not a normal person'), taman! ('agreed, OK'), etc. The word taman is also used in some Slavic languages (South Slavic) and almost perfectly translates lagom to those languages.

In Chinese philosophy, the concept of 中庸 (pinyin: zhōngyōng) expresses the similar concept.

In Thai, the word พอเพียง (phor phiang) expresses a similar meaning.

In Indonesia, both Indonesian and Javanese, there is a common word for it, pas, which means 'right amount (countable measurement), match, enough'.

In Swiss German dialects, similar to lagom, is the word gäbig; in German, the term means something like 'comfortable, suitable, handy' in the case of objects, or in relation to people and conditions 'affable, pleasant, sympathetic'.

== See also ==
- Centrism, a political ideology
- Festina lente
- Gezellig
- Golden mean (philosophy)
- Goldilocks principle
- Hygge
- Law of Jante
- Mathematical optimization, choosing not too high, not too low values of input parameters in view to maximize/minimize an objective function
- Moderate, a middle position in a left/right political scale
- Moderation, eliminating or lessening extremes
- Simple living
- Slow movement
- Social model
- The Story of the Three Bears
- Sweden: The Middle Way
- Sweet spot
- Via media, the philosophy of the 'middle way'
- Wasat (Islamic term)
