= Argument to moderation =

Informal fallacy that the truth is always a compromise

Argument to moderation (Latin: argumentum ad temperantiam)—also known as the false compromise, argument from middle ground, fallacy of gray, middle ground fallacy, or golden mean fallacy—is the fallacy of assuming that the truth or best solution always lies in the middle of two opposing positions.

It does not suggest that an argument for the middle solution or for a compromise is always fallacious, but rather that it is wrong to assume that compromise is correct in every situation. It thus applies primarily in cases where insisting upon a compromise position is ill-informed, unfeasible, or impossible, or where an argument is incorrectly made that a position is correct simply because it is in the middle.

For example, if one person correctly claims the daytime sky on Earth is blue and another incorrectly claims it is yellow, an argument to moderation would falsely conclude that the sky is green, an intermediate color, simply because it lies between the two claims.

== See also ==
- Appeal to tradition – Logical fallacy in which a thesis is deemed correct on the basis of tradition
- Dialectic – Method of reasoning and philosophical argument
- Excluded middle – Opposite logical fallacy to the argument to moderation
- False balance – Reporting on a fringe assertion as if it were legitimate debate
- Overton window – Range of ideas tolerated in public discourse
- Ratchet effect – Restrained ability of human process reversal
- Straw man – Form of incorrect argument and informal fallacy
- View from nowhere – Principle in journalism
- Wisdom of the crowd – Collective perception of a group of people
- Paradox of tolerance – Logical paradox in decision-making theory
- Slippery slope – Rhetorical argument
