= Rudolf Alfred Höger =

Austrian painter (1877–1930)

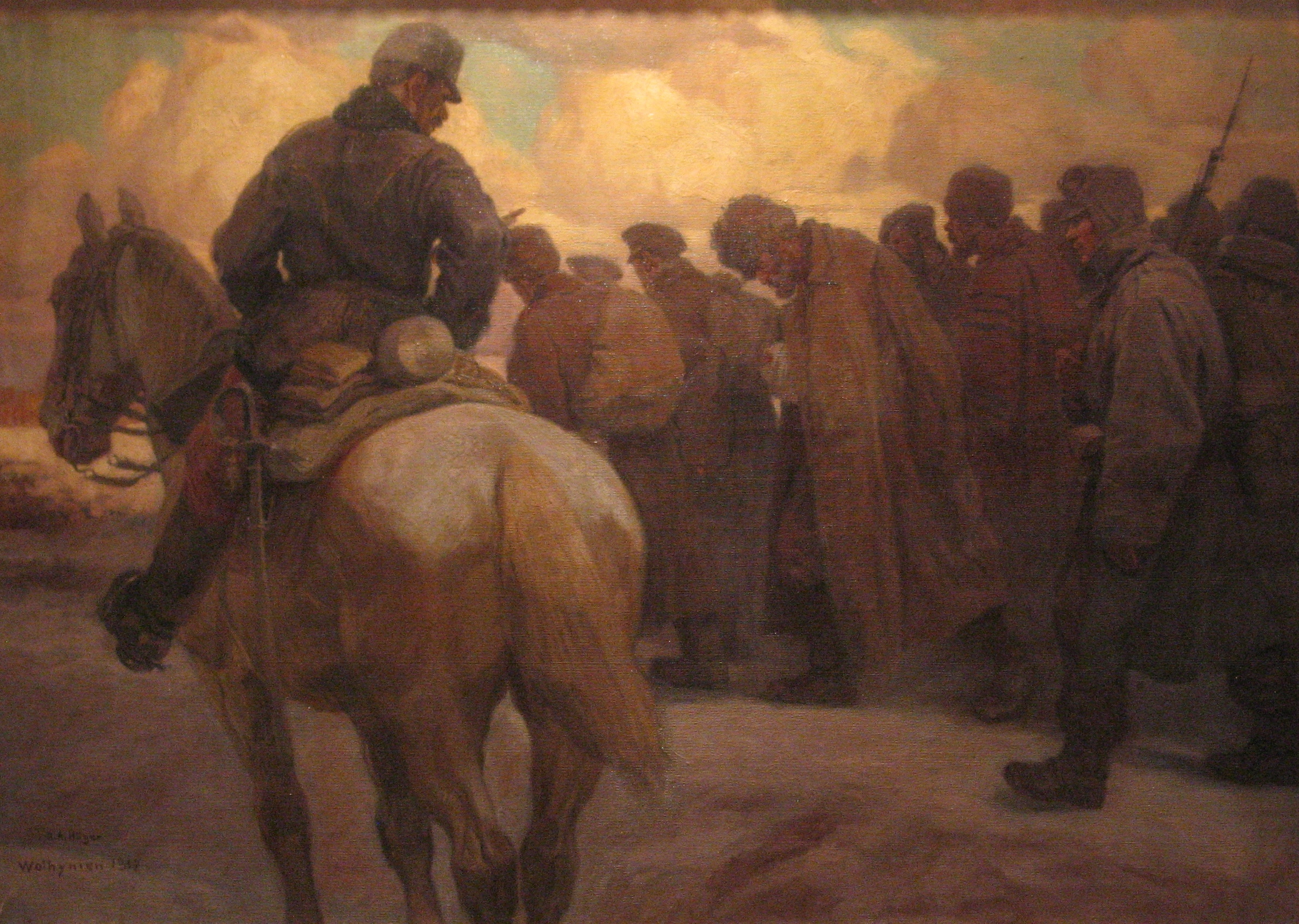
- Nach dem Vorstoß, Russische Kriegsgefangene, 1917, oil on canvas, c. 100 × 140 cm, Heeresgeschichtliches Museum
- Born: 12 February 1877; Proßnitz, Moravia, Austria-Hungary
- Died: 7 November 1930 (aged 53); Vienna, Austria
- Known for: Genre art; War art

Rudolf Alfred Höger (12 February 1877 – 7 November 1930) was an Austrian painter of genre art and war art.

== Biography ==
Höger was born in Proßnitz, Moravia. Little is known about his life. It seems likely that, during World War I, he was a member of the group for art in the k.u.k. Kriegspressequartier, the empire's press agency for war news, at least from 1914 to 1917. During this time, he created many works which are now in the collection of the Heeresgeschichtliches Museum, mostly oil paintings on the Eastern Front and the Balkan Front. He died in Vienna.

== Paintings ==
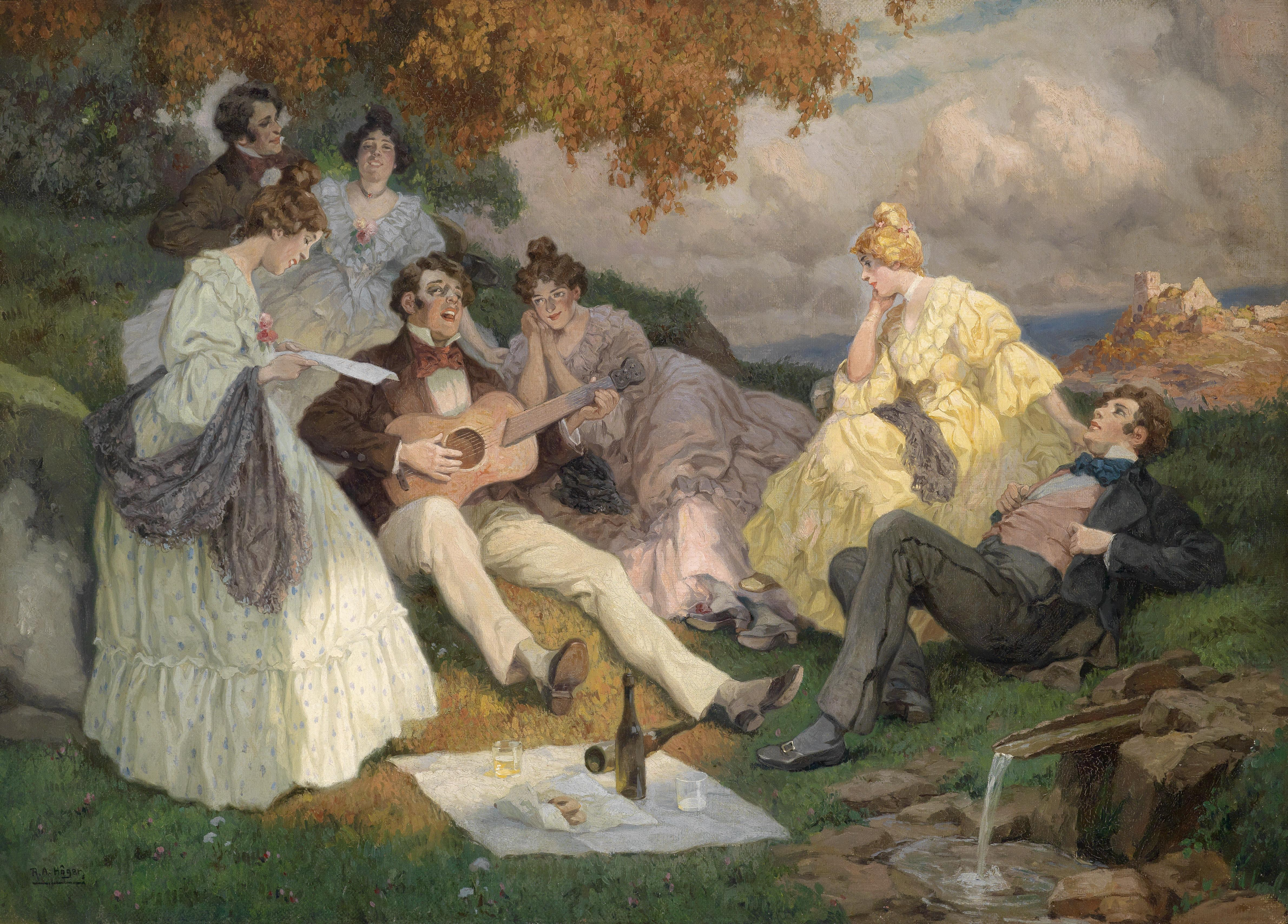
Fröhliche Sangesrunde mit einer Donaulandschaft, 1900, oil, 90 x 124 cm

Höger painted genre art with nostalgic topics, such as Das Hofkonzert (The concert at court), a rococo scene, a late nineteenth-century or early twentieth-century painting of listening to chamber music in the eighteenth century. The artist based its details on possibly older paintings and not a work from direct experience of the period in which the events took place. Also other pictures by his hand represent a time era that already had passed, like Fröhliche Sangesrunde mit einer Donaulandschaft (Happy round of singers with a landscape on the Danube), a scene that did not originate in the period being depicted, but some years before, a denial of the artist's own time—a wish to escape from it by retreating into fantasy. Other paintings depict historical scenes, or everyday life scenes from a time not actually in the artist's experience, like Hausmusik (Music at home), Der Vorleser (The recitator), Picknick in Dürnstein, Fröhliche Gesellschaft in den Wachauer Weinbergen (Happy gathering in the vineyards of the Wachau) and Im Maien (In May). He also painted contemporary scenes at the turn of the 19/20th century; such as Beim Heurigen in Grinzing (At the Heuriger in Grinzing), Markttag (A day at the market), Gaudeamus Igitur and Obstmarkt in Venedig (Fruit market in Venice). Rudolf Alfred Höger painted landscapes and also chose biblical topics such as Susanne und die beiden Alten (Susanna and the two elders).

== Selected works ==
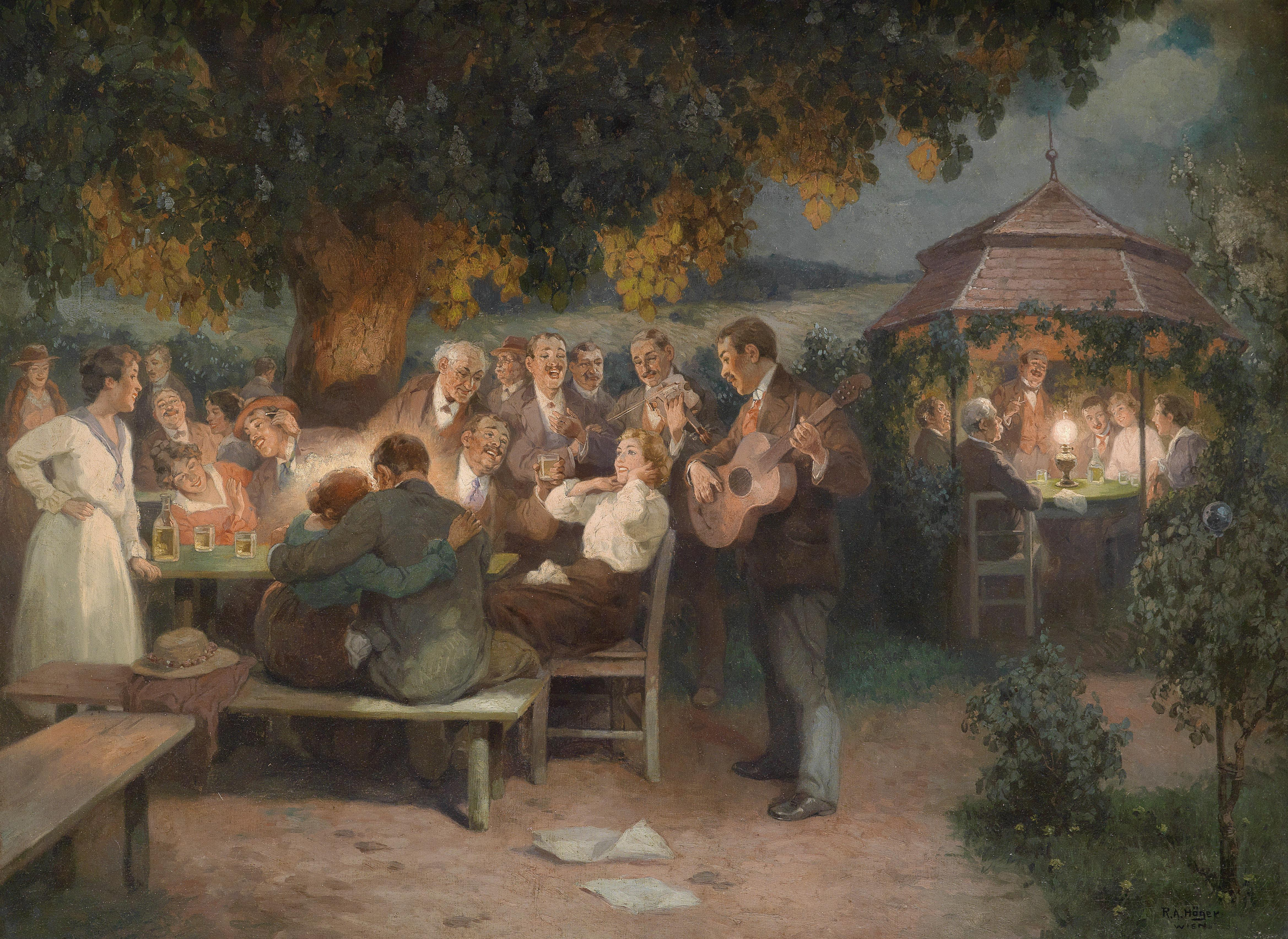
Beim Heurigen in Grinzing
1900, oil painting, 74 x 105 cm

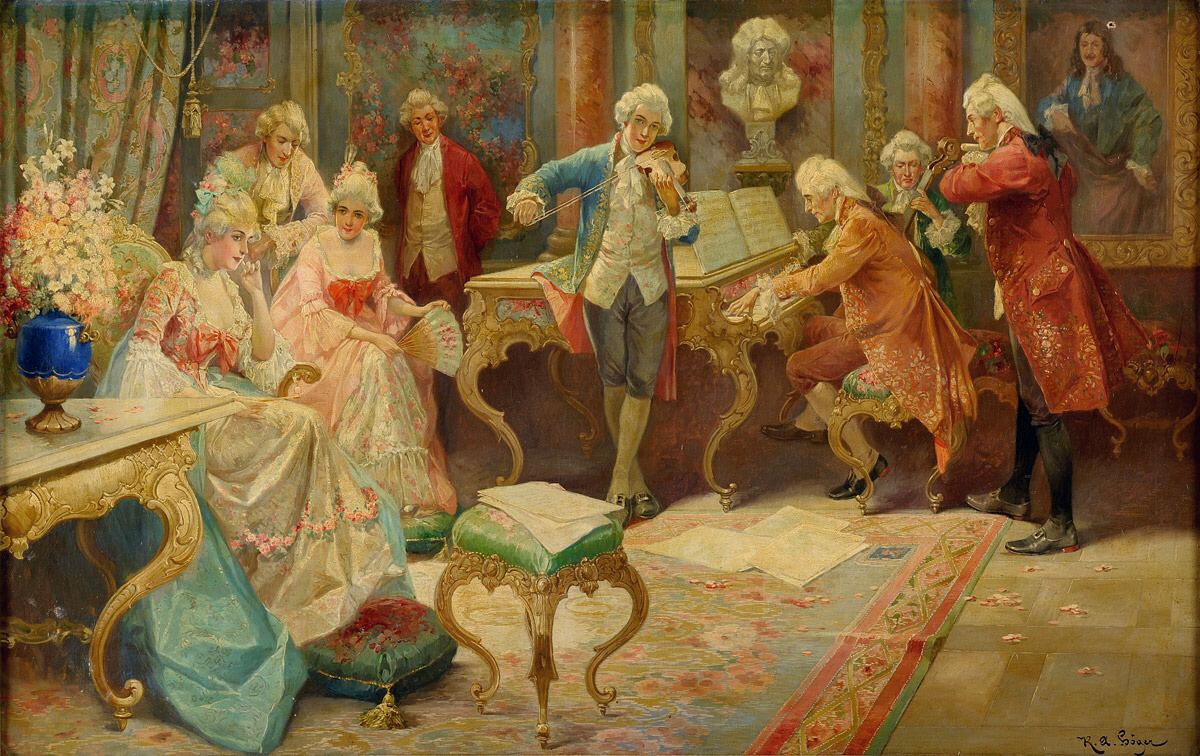
Das Hofkonzert
1900, oil painting, 82 x 130 cm

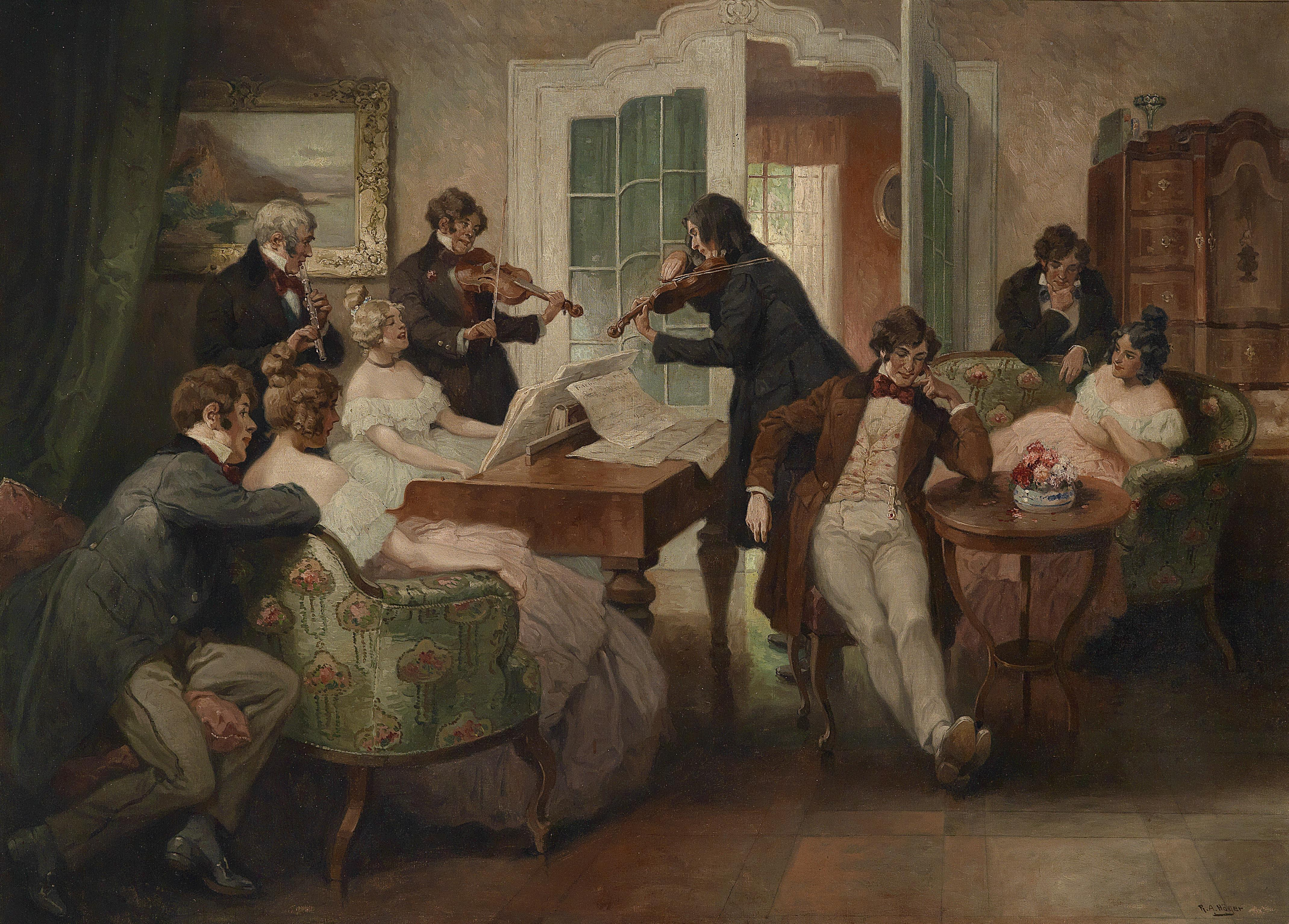
Hausmusik
1900, oil painting, 90 x 125 cm

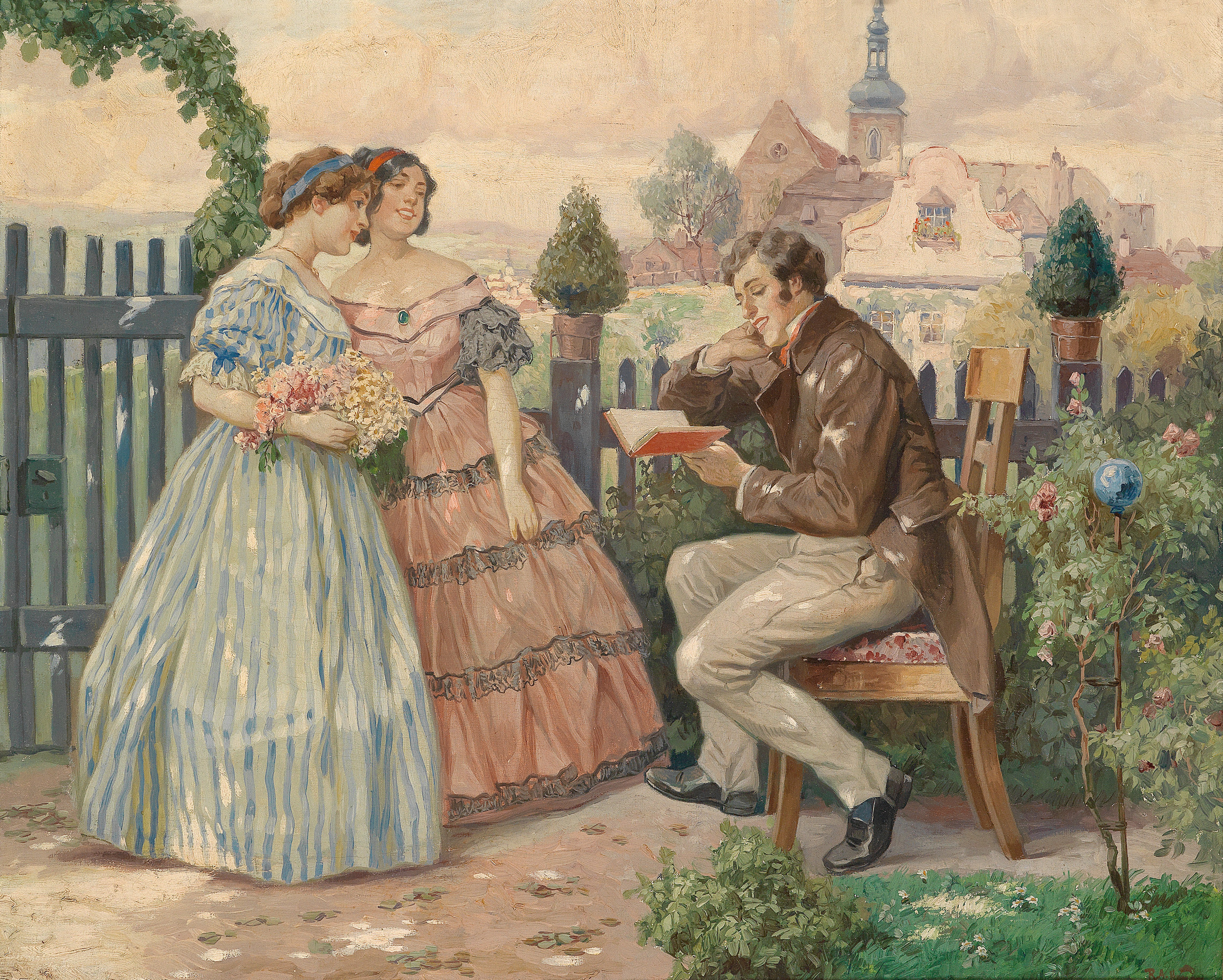
Der Vorleser
1930, oil painting, 56 x 68 cm

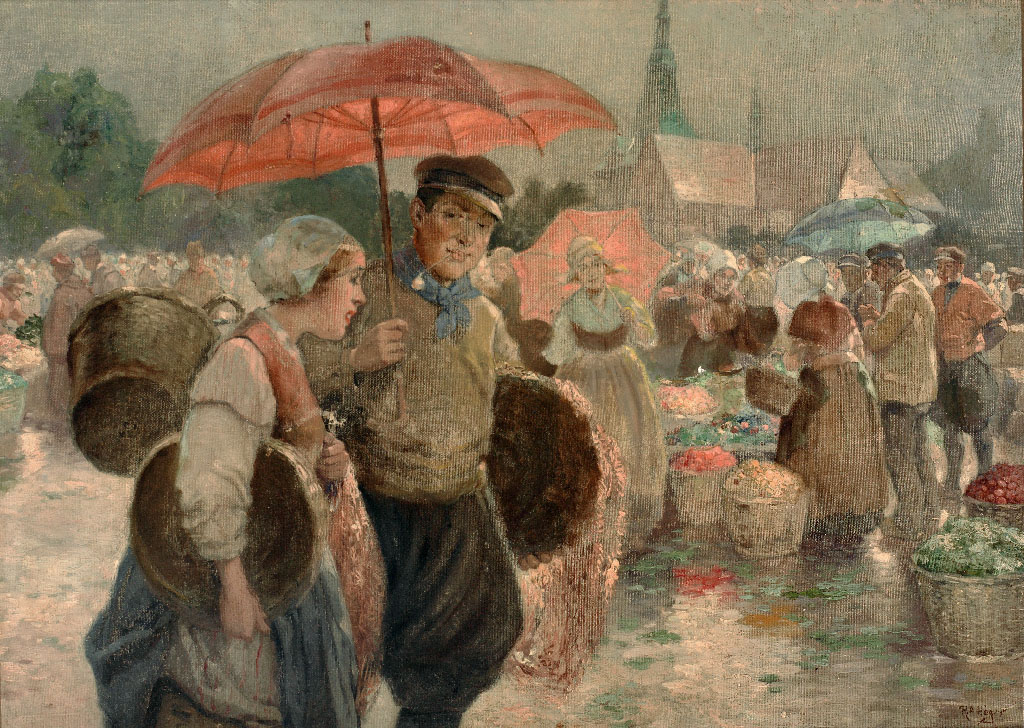
Markttag
1930, oil painting, 56 x 75 cm
