= Golden mean (philosophy) =

Aphorism against extremism

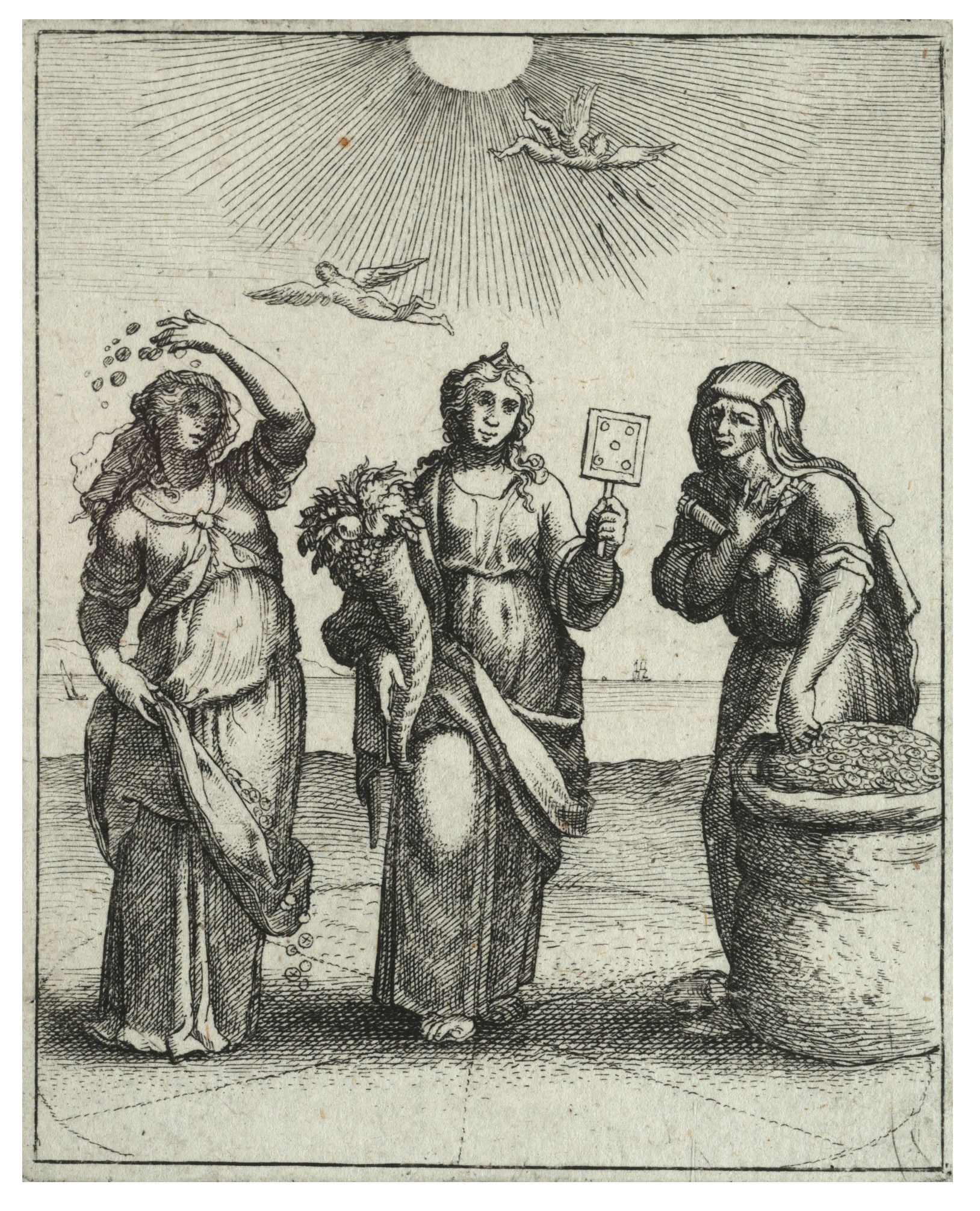
An allegory of the golden mean: a figure of moderation and prosperity between one of prodigality and another of miserliness

The golden mean or golden middle way is the desirable middle between two extremes, one of excess and the other of deficiency. It appeared in Greek at least as early as the Delphic maxim "nothing in excess", which was discussed in Plato's Philebus. Aristotle analyzed the golden mean in the Nicomachean Ethics Book II: That virtues of character can be described as means. It was subsequently emphasized in Aristotelian virtue ethics. For example, in the Aristotelian view, courage is a virtue, but if taken to excess would manifest as recklessness, and, in deficiency, cowardice. The middle way form of government for Aristotle was a blend between monarchy, democracy and aristocracy.

== History ==
=== Western philosophy ===
==== Crete ====
The earliest representation of this idea in culture is probably in the mythological Cretan tale of Daedalus and Icarus. Daedalus, a famous artist of his time, built feathered wings for himself and his son so that they might escape the clutches of King Minos. Daedalus warns his beloved son to "fly the middle course", between the sea spray and the sun's heat. Icarus did not heed his father; he flew up and up until the sun melted the wax off his wings. For not heeding the middle course, he fell into the sea and drowned.

==== Delphi ====
Another early elaboration is the Doric saying carved on the front of the temple at Delphi: "Nothing in excess" ("Μηδὲν ἄγαν").

==== Cleobulus ====
To Cleobulus is attributed the maxim: Μέτρον ἄριστον ("Moderation is best").

==== Socrates ====
Socrates teaches that a man must know "how to choose the mean and avoid the extremes on either side, as far as possible."

In education, Socrates asks us to consider the effect of either an exclusive devotion to gymnastics or an exclusive devotion to music. It either "produced a temper of hardness and ferocity, (or) the other of softness and effeminacy." Having both qualities, he believed, produces harmony; i.e., beauty and goodness.

==== Plato ====
Proportion's relation to beauty and goodness is stressed throughout Plato's dialogues, particularly in the Republic and Philebus. He writes (Phlb. 64d–65a):

Socrates: "That any kind of mixture that does not in some way or other possess measure of the nature of proportion will necessarily corrupt its ingredients and most of all itself. For there would be no blending in such a case at all but really an unconnected medley, the ruin of whatever happens to be contained in it."
Protarchus: "Very true."
Socrates: "But now we notice that the force of the good has taken up refuge in an alliance with the nature of the beautiful. For measure and proportion manifest themselves in all areas of beauty and virtue."
Protarchus: "Undeniably."
Socrates: "But we said that truth is also inclined along with them in our mixture?"
Protarchus: "Indeed."
Socrates: "Well, then, if we cannot capture the good in one form, we will have to take hold of it in a conjunction of three: beauty, proportion and truth. Let us affirm that these should by right be treated as a unity and be held responsible for what is in the mixture, for goodness is what makes the mixture good in itself."

In the Laws, Plato applies this principle to electing a government in the ideal state: "Conducted in this way, the election will strike a mean between monarchy and democracy …"

==== Aristotle ====
In the Eudemian Ethics, Aristotle writes on the virtues. Aristotle’s theory on virtue ethics is one that does not see a person’s actions as a reflection of their ethics but rather looks into the character of a person as the reason behind their ethics. His constant phrase is, "… is the Middle state between …". His psychology of the soul and its virtues is based on the golden mean between the extremes. In the Politics, Aristotle criticizes the Spartan Polity by critiquing the disproportionate elements of the constitution; e.g., they trained the men and not the women, and they trained for war but not peace. This disharmony produced difficulties which he elaborates on in his work. See also the discussion in the Nicomachean Ethics of the golden mean, and Aristotelian ethics in general.

Each intellectual virtue is a mental skill or habit by which the mind arrives at truth, affirming what is or denying what is not. In the Nicomachean Ethics he discusses 11 moral virtues:

SPHERE OF ACTION OR FEELING	EXCESS	MEAN: MORAL VIRTUE	DEFICIENCY
Fear and confidence	Rashness	Courage in the face of fear	Cowardice
Pleasure and pain	Licentiousness/self-indulgence	Temperance in the face of pleasure and pain	Insensibility
Getting and spending (minor)	Prodigality	Liberality with wealth and possessions	Illiberality/meanness
Getting and spending (major)	Vulgarity/tastelessness	Magnificence with great wealth and possessions	Pettiness/stinginess
Honour and dishonour (major)	Vanity	Magnanimity with great honors	Pusillanimity
Honour and dishonour (minor)	Ambition/empty vanity	Proper ambition with normal honors	Unambitiousness/undue humility
Anger	Irascibility	Patience/good temper	Lack of spirit/unirascibility
Self-expression	Boastfulness	Truthfulness with self-expression	Understatement/mock modesty
Conversation	Buffoonery	Wittiness in conversation	Boorishness
Social conduct	Obsequiousness	Friendliness in social conduct	Cantankerousness
Shame	Shyness	Modesty in the face of shame or shamelessness	Shamelessness
Indignation	Envy	Righteous indignation in the face of injury	Malicious enjoyment/spitefulness

Intellectual virtues

1. Nous (intelligence), which apprehends fundamental truths (such as definitions, self-evident principles)
2. Episteme (science), which is skill with inferential reasoning (such as proofs, syllogisms, demonstrations)
3. Sophia (theoretical wisdom), which combines fundamental truths with valid, necessary inferences to reason well about unchanging truths.

Aristotle also mentions several other traits:

- Gnome (good sense) – passing judgment, "sympathetic understanding"
- Synesis (understanding) – comprehending what others say, does not issue commands
- Phronesis (practical wisdom) – knowledge of what to do, knowledge of changing truths, issues commands
- Techne (art, craftsmanship)

Aristotle's list is not the only list, however. As Alasdair MacIntyre observed in After Virtue, thinkers as diverse as Homer, the authors of the New Testament, Thomas Aquinas, and Benjamin Franklin have all proposed lists.

Jacques Maritain, throughout his Introduction to Philosophy (1930), uses the idea of the golden mean to place Aristotelian-Thomist philosophy between the deficiencies and extremes of other philosophers and systems.

=== Eastern philosophy ===
Gautama Buddha (fl. 6th century BC) taught of the Middle Way, a path between the extremes of religious asceticism and worldly self-indulgence.

Confucius in The Analects, written through the Warring States period of Ancient China (c. 479 BC – 221 BC), taught excess is similar to deficiency. A way of living in the mean is the way of Zhongyong.

Zhuangzi was the Tao's most famous commentator (369–286 BC).

Tiruvalluvar (2nd century BC and the 8th century AD; date disputed) in his Tirukkural of the Sangam period of Tamilakam writes of the middle state which is to preserve equity. He emphasises this principle and suggests that the two ways of preserving equity is to be impartial and avoid excess. Parimelalagar was the historical commentator of the Tirukkural.

=== Judaism ===
Rambam in Mishneh Torah attributes this method to the first scholars (Chazal), and to Abraham. Indeed, a similar concept exists even in the Rabbinic literature, Tosefta and the Yerushalmi. Yitzhak Arama finds references even in the Bible.

One such instance is Ecclesiastes 7:15-16, where the preacher admonishes his audience to "be not righteous over much" and to "be not over much wicked." Adam Clarke takes the phrase "righteous over much" to mean indulging in too much "austerity and hard study," and concludes that “there is no need of all this watching, fasting, praying, self-denial, etc., you carry things to extremes. Why should you wish to be reputed singular and precise?” Thus, the ideal of the golden mean may have existed as long as six hundred years before Aristotle. However, some scholars, such as Albert Barnes, hold a slightly different interpretation of Ecclesiastes 7:16-17.

The golden mean is also a core principle in Musar literature in which practitioners are encouraged to bring every character trait (middah; plural middot) into a balanced place between extremes. For example, it is not good to have too much patience, but it is not good to live without any patience at all. Musar can be said to involve being mindful enough to bring one's character traits, thoughts and desires into a balanced state in real time; living one's life in accord with the golden mean.

=== Christianity ===
Thomas Aquinas, the medieval Catholic philosopher and theologian, in his Summa Theologiae, Prima Secundæ Partis, Question 64, argued that Christian morality is consistent with the mean: "evil consists in discordance from their rule or measure. Now this may happen either by their exceeding the measure or by their falling short of it[.] ... Therefore it is evident that moral virtue observes the mean."

=== Islam ===
Islam promotes the golden mean in many instances. The Quran states an example in finance, in that a person should not spend all he makes as not to be caught needing, and not to be stingy as to not live a comfortable life. Muhammad also had a saying "خير الأمور أوسطها" meaning the best choice is the middle ground/golden mean one. In Quran (Chapter 'The Cow', verse number 143) it is said that, "We have made you a balanced, moderate nation".

Quran quotes the example of two groups of people, calling one of them extremely greedy (Chasing the wealth of the world) in Chapter 'The Cow' verse 96 and to the others as inventors of monasticism (over-zealousness in religion) in Chapter Al-Hadeed verse number 27. Islam counsels its followers to abstain from both these paths of extremities and adopt moderation in chasing the world and practicing religion alike.

Not the least the Quran emphasises that the Muslim community (Umma) is a ’middle nation’ / a 'just community' / an Umma justly balanced / a moderate nation / a midmost nation (ummatan wasaTan) in verse 2-143: a middle between extremism and sloppiness.

== Fallacies associated with the golden mean ==
The belief that a compromise between two extremes is always best is a logical fallacy known as argument to moderation (or the golden mean fallacy). For example:

- Bob wants to sell his computer at its current market value of $800. Alice offers to pay $1. It is fallacious to conclude that $400.50 is a fair price.
- Independent medical researchers found that smoking cigarettes is harmful, while tobacco companies refuted this. The first statement is factually correct: there is no middle ground. (See also: false balance)
- An authoritarian government wants to exterminate all members of a certain ethnic group. The ethnic group argues that they have a right to live in peace. It is fallacious to conclude that the most ethical path lies somewhere in the middle of these extremes. (See also: paradox of tolerance)

== See also ==
- Apatheia
- Via media
- Neutrality
- Golden mean in virtue ethics
- Argument to moderation (logical fallacy)
  - Juste milieu (French political philosophy)
  - Sweden: the Middle Way
- Median voter theorem
- Middle Way (Buddhist analog)
- Molinism (middle knowledge)
- Doctrine of the Mean (Confucian analog)
- Golden ratio (golden mean applied to aesthetics, mathematics, geometry)
- Mathematical optimization
- Goldilocks principle

== Bibliography ==
- The Greek Way, Edith Hamilton, W. W. Norton & Co., NY, 1993.
- Sailing the Wine-Dark Sea, Why the Greeks Matter, Thomas Cahill, Nan A. Talese an imprint of Doubleday, NY, 2003.
