= Moriz Jung =

Austrian artist (1885–1915)

Moriz Jung (22 October 1885 – 11 March 1915) was an Austrian artist and graphic designer. He is best known for his work as part of the Wiener Werkstätte.

== Biography ==
Born in Nikolsburg in Moravia, Austria-Hungary (now Mikulov in the Czech Republic) in 1885, Jung attended the Kunstgewerbeschule in Vienna from 1901 to 1908, where he produced woodcuts, linocuts, lithographs, postcards and book images in a distinctive humorous, often bizarre, graphic style under tutors Carl Otto Czeschka, Bertold Löffler, Felician Myrbach and Alfred Roller.

During his studies he published a book of colored woodcuts of animals, Freunde geschnitten und gedruckt von Moriz Jung (Lipsia and Vienna, 1906), and in 1907 received a prestigious commission from the Wiener Werkstätte to create the poster for the newly opened Viennese "Cabaret Fledermaus". In 1907, whilst still a student at the Kunstgewerbeschule, Jung began contributing designs for the Wiener Werkstätte's 63 postcards which now form the bulk of his surviving works.

Jung's career was short but prolific: he published 10 works at age 18 and continued to produce many works every year. His works could be found in Ver Sacrum, (one of the most important publications in Vienna's art scene of the time), Erdgeist, Der Ruf, in the sports review of the Fremdenblatt and in the social democratic satirical magazine Die Glühlichter publishing socially critical caricatures under "a variety of aliases", such as Simon Mölzlagl or – in reference to his birthplace – Nikolaus Burger. At the 1908 art show, Jung was represented with three works in the poster room, curated by Bertold Löffler. After 1910, Jung moved to Berlin to work in a graphics institute.

Jung did not agree with the widespread war euphoria of the time, and wrote "All doubts about vocation and the like have disappeared, blown away in the thunder of the guns, and when I fall in the field, I know that I have not only lived for myself but also for my people."

In 1914, he was called up for military service and in September was seriously injured in Galicia by a shot in the left thigh. As soon as he had recovered, he had to go back to the front and was killed in the winter-long Carpathian Battle on March 11, 1915, on the Manilowa Heights near the village of Łubne, south of Baligród. He was only 29 at the time but received recognition in numerous obituaries such as those in the Prager Tagblatt and Fremden-Blatt newspapers. The latter said of him: "Jung was one of the most gifted caricaturists of the modern Viennese school. His woodcuts and black-and-white sheets were particularly appreciated by connoisseurs."
